

370001–370100 

|-bgcolor=#fefefe
| 370001 ||  || — || October 6, 1999 || Socorro || LINEAR || — || align=right data-sort-value="0.94" | 940 m || 
|-id=002 bgcolor=#fefefe
| 370002 ||  || — || October 6, 1999 || Socorro || LINEAR || FLO || align=right data-sort-value="0.70" | 700 m || 
|-id=003 bgcolor=#fefefe
| 370003 ||  || — || October 7, 1999 || Socorro || LINEAR || — || align=right data-sort-value="0.80" | 800 m || 
|-id=004 bgcolor=#fefefe
| 370004 ||  || — || October 7, 1999 || Socorro || LINEAR || — || align=right data-sort-value="0.84" | 840 m || 
|-id=005 bgcolor=#fefefe
| 370005 ||  || — || October 9, 1999 || Socorro || LINEAR || NYS || align=right data-sort-value="0.79" | 790 m || 
|-id=006 bgcolor=#E9E9E9
| 370006 ||  || — || October 1, 1999 || Kitt Peak || Spacewatch || — || align=right | 3.6 km || 
|-id=007 bgcolor=#fefefe
| 370007 ||  || — || November 12, 1999 || Socorro || LINEAR || — || align=right | 1.1 km || 
|-id=008 bgcolor=#fefefe
| 370008 ||  || — || November 14, 1999 || Socorro || LINEAR || — || align=right data-sort-value="0.87" | 870 m || 
|-id=009 bgcolor=#fefefe
| 370009 ||  || — || November 28, 1999 || Kitt Peak || Spacewatch || critical || align=right data-sort-value="0.57" | 570 m || 
|-id=010 bgcolor=#fefefe
| 370010 ||  || — || December 12, 1999 || Kitt Peak || Spacewatch || MAS || align=right data-sort-value="0.52" | 520 m || 
|-id=011 bgcolor=#fefefe
| 370011 ||  || — || January 6, 2000 || Kleť || Kleť Obs. || ERI || align=right | 1.7 km || 
|-id=012 bgcolor=#fefefe
| 370012 ||  || — || January 5, 2000 || Socorro || LINEAR || — || align=right data-sort-value="0.94" | 940 m || 
|-id=013 bgcolor=#d6d6d6
| 370013 ||  || — || January 6, 2000 || Kitt Peak || Spacewatch || NAE || align=right | 5.4 km || 
|-id=014 bgcolor=#fefefe
| 370014 ||  || — || February 8, 2000 || Kitt Peak || Spacewatch || NYS || align=right data-sort-value="0.65" | 650 m || 
|-id=015 bgcolor=#d6d6d6
| 370015 ||  || — || February 4, 2000 || Kitt Peak || Spacewatch || — || align=right | 3.9 km || 
|-id=016 bgcolor=#fefefe
| 370016 ||  || — || February 29, 2000 || Socorro || LINEAR || — || align=right | 1.1 km || 
|-id=017 bgcolor=#d6d6d6
| 370017 ||  || — || January 27, 2000 || Kitt Peak || Spacewatch || — || align=right | 3.3 km || 
|-id=018 bgcolor=#fefefe
| 370018 ||  || — || February 29, 2000 || Socorro || LINEAR || — || align=right | 1.4 km || 
|-id=019 bgcolor=#fefefe
| 370019 ||  || — || March 5, 2000 || Socorro || LINEAR || — || align=right | 1.3 km || 
|-id=020 bgcolor=#d6d6d6
| 370020 ||  || — || March 3, 2000 || Kitt Peak || Spacewatch || — || align=right | 2.2 km || 
|-id=021 bgcolor=#d6d6d6
| 370021 ||  || — || March 3, 2000 || Kitt Peak || Spacewatch || — || align=right | 3.3 km || 
|-id=022 bgcolor=#fefefe
| 370022 ||  || — || March 11, 2000 || Anderson Mesa || LONEOS || V || align=right | 1.2 km || 
|-id=023 bgcolor=#fefefe
| 370023 ||  || — || March 4, 2000 || Kitt Peak || Spacewatch || NYS || align=right data-sort-value="0.63" | 630 m || 
|-id=024 bgcolor=#fefefe
| 370024 ||  || — || April 1, 2000 || Kitt Peak || Spacewatch || NYS || align=right data-sort-value="0.77" | 770 m || 
|-id=025 bgcolor=#d6d6d6
| 370025 ||  || — || April 24, 2000 || Kitt Peak || Spacewatch || — || align=right | 3.6 km || 
|-id=026 bgcolor=#E9E9E9
| 370026 ||  || — || July 29, 2000 || Anderson Mesa || LONEOS || — || align=right | 2.6 km || 
|-id=027 bgcolor=#FA8072
| 370027 ||  || — || August 1, 2000 || Socorro || LINEAR || — || align=right data-sort-value="0.67" | 670 m || 
|-id=028 bgcolor=#E9E9E9
| 370028 ||  || — || August 2, 2000 || Socorro || LINEAR || JUN || align=right | 1.3 km || 
|-id=029 bgcolor=#E9E9E9
| 370029 ||  || — || August 28, 2000 || Socorro || LINEAR || — || align=right | 1.9 km || 
|-id=030 bgcolor=#E9E9E9
| 370030 ||  || — || August 24, 2000 || Socorro || LINEAR || ADE || align=right | 2.6 km || 
|-id=031 bgcolor=#fefefe
| 370031 ||  || — || August 31, 2000 || Socorro || LINEAR || H || align=right data-sort-value="0.62" | 620 m || 
|-id=032 bgcolor=#E9E9E9
| 370032 ||  || — || September 1, 2000 || Socorro || LINEAR || EUN || align=right | 1.5 km || 
|-id=033 bgcolor=#E9E9E9
| 370033 ||  || — || September 6, 2000 || Socorro || LINEAR || — || align=right | 2.3 km || 
|-id=034 bgcolor=#E9E9E9
| 370034 ||  || — || September 21, 2000 || Haleakala || NEAT || — || align=right | 2.3 km || 
|-id=035 bgcolor=#E9E9E9
| 370035 ||  || — || September 20, 2000 || Socorro || LINEAR || — || align=right | 2.5 km || 
|-id=036 bgcolor=#E9E9E9
| 370036 ||  || — || September 20, 2000 || Kitt Peak || Spacewatch || — || align=right | 2.0 km || 
|-id=037 bgcolor=#FFC2E0
| 370037 ||  || — || September 24, 2000 || Socorro || LINEAR || AMOcritical || align=right data-sort-value="0.56" | 560 m || 
|-id=038 bgcolor=#E9E9E9
| 370038 ||  || — || September 23, 2000 || Socorro || LINEAR || — || align=right | 2.3 km || 
|-id=039 bgcolor=#fefefe
| 370039 ||  || — || September 24, 2000 || Socorro || LINEAR || — || align=right data-sort-value="0.86" | 860 m || 
|-id=040 bgcolor=#fefefe
| 370040 ||  || — || September 23, 2000 || Socorro || LINEAR || H || align=right data-sort-value="0.96" | 960 m || 
|-id=041 bgcolor=#E9E9E9
| 370041 ||  || — || September 24, 2000 || Socorro || LINEAR || — || align=right | 1.4 km || 
|-id=042 bgcolor=#E9E9E9
| 370042 ||  || — || September 24, 2000 || Socorro || LINEAR || EUN || align=right | 1.5 km || 
|-id=043 bgcolor=#E9E9E9
| 370043 ||  || — || September 24, 2000 || Socorro || LINEAR || — || align=right | 1.5 km || 
|-id=044 bgcolor=#E9E9E9
| 370044 ||  || — || September 22, 2000 || Socorro || LINEAR || — || align=right | 2.4 km || 
|-id=045 bgcolor=#E9E9E9
| 370045 ||  || — || September 23, 2000 || Socorro || LINEAR || — || align=right | 2.1 km || 
|-id=046 bgcolor=#fefefe
| 370046 ||  || — || September 24, 2000 || Socorro || LINEAR || FLO || align=right data-sort-value="0.76" | 760 m || 
|-id=047 bgcolor=#fefefe
| 370047 ||  || — || August 31, 2000 || Socorro || LINEAR || — || align=right data-sort-value="0.96" | 960 m || 
|-id=048 bgcolor=#E9E9E9
| 370048 ||  || — || September 27, 2000 || Socorro || LINEAR || — || align=right | 1.9 km || 
|-id=049 bgcolor=#E9E9E9
| 370049 ||  || — || September 24, 2000 || Socorro || LINEAR || — || align=right | 1.9 km || 
|-id=050 bgcolor=#E9E9E9
| 370050 ||  || — || September 27, 2000 || Socorro || LINEAR || — || align=right | 2.9 km || 
|-id=051 bgcolor=#E9E9E9
| 370051 ||  || — || September 28, 2000 || Socorro || LINEAR || ADE || align=right | 3.8 km || 
|-id=052 bgcolor=#E9E9E9
| 370052 ||  || — || September 30, 2000 || Socorro || LINEAR || JUN || align=right | 1.5 km || 
|-id=053 bgcolor=#E9E9E9
| 370053 ||  || — || September 28, 2000 || Anderson Mesa || LONEOS || — || align=right | 3.4 km || 
|-id=054 bgcolor=#E9E9E9
| 370054 ||  || — || October 3, 2000 || Socorro || LINEAR || — || align=right | 2.4 km || 
|-id=055 bgcolor=#E9E9E9
| 370055 ||  || — || October 3, 2000 || Anderson Mesa || LONEOS || JUN || align=right | 1.5 km || 
|-id=056 bgcolor=#E9E9E9
| 370056 ||  || — || October 25, 2000 || Socorro || LINEAR || — || align=right | 2.1 km || 
|-id=057 bgcolor=#E9E9E9
| 370057 ||  || — || October 31, 2000 || Socorro || LINEAR || — || align=right | 2.9 km || 
|-id=058 bgcolor=#E9E9E9
| 370058 ||  || — || November 1, 2000 || Socorro || LINEAR || — || align=right | 3.2 km || 
|-id=059 bgcolor=#fefefe
| 370059 ||  || — || November 19, 2000 || Socorro || LINEAR || H || align=right data-sort-value="0.77" | 770 m || 
|-id=060 bgcolor=#fefefe
| 370060 ||  || — || November 30, 2000 || Socorro || LINEAR || FLO || align=right data-sort-value="0.94" | 940 m || 
|-id=061 bgcolor=#FFC2E0
| 370061 ||  || — || December 28, 2000 || Socorro || LINEAR || APO +1km || align=right | 1.0 km || 
|-id=062 bgcolor=#E9E9E9
| 370062 ||  || — || January 15, 2001 || Kitt Peak || Spacewatch || — || align=right | 2.9 km || 
|-id=063 bgcolor=#E9E9E9
| 370063 ||  || — || January 17, 2001 || Oizumi || T. Kobayashi || — || align=right | 2.6 km || 
|-id=064 bgcolor=#E9E9E9
| 370064 ||  || — || January 21, 2001 || Socorro || LINEAR || — || align=right | 2.9 km || 
|-id=065 bgcolor=#E9E9E9
| 370065 ||  || — || February 12, 2001 || Anderson Mesa || LONEOS || — || align=right | 2.9 km || 
|-id=066 bgcolor=#d6d6d6
| 370066 ||  || — || March 28, 2001 || Kitt Peak || Spacewatch || EOS || align=right | 2.3 km || 
|-id=067 bgcolor=#fefefe
| 370067 ||  || — || March 24, 2001 || Anderson Mesa || LONEOS || — || align=right | 1.3 km || 
|-id=068 bgcolor=#d6d6d6
| 370068 Chrisholmberg ||  ||  || March 21, 2001 || Kitt Peak || SKADS || EOS || align=right | 1.6 km || 
|-id=069 bgcolor=#d6d6d6
| 370069 ||  || — || July 13, 2001 || Palomar || NEAT || — || align=right | 5.5 km || 
|-id=070 bgcolor=#d6d6d6
| 370070 ||  || — || August 14, 2001 || Palomar || NEAT || THB || align=right | 3.5 km || 
|-id=071 bgcolor=#E9E9E9
| 370071 ||  || — || August 17, 2001 || Socorro || LINEAR || — || align=right | 2.2 km || 
|-id=072 bgcolor=#E9E9E9
| 370072 ||  || — || August 28, 2001 || Ondřejov || L. Kotková || — || align=right | 1.5 km || 
|-id=073 bgcolor=#E9E9E9
| 370073 ||  || — || September 10, 2001 || Socorro || LINEAR || — || align=right data-sort-value="0.90" | 900 m || 
|-id=074 bgcolor=#E9E9E9
| 370074 ||  || — || September 11, 2001 || Anderson Mesa || LONEOS || — || align=right data-sort-value="0.84" | 840 m || 
|-id=075 bgcolor=#E9E9E9
| 370075 ||  || — || September 11, 2001 || Anderson Mesa || LONEOS || — || align=right | 1.1 km || 
|-id=076 bgcolor=#d6d6d6
| 370076 ||  || — || September 12, 2001 || Socorro || LINEAR || THM || align=right | 2.6 km || 
|-id=077 bgcolor=#fefefe
| 370077 ||  || — || September 12, 2001 || Socorro || LINEAR || LCI || align=right | 1.1 km || 
|-id=078 bgcolor=#E9E9E9
| 370078 ||  || — || September 12, 2001 || Socorro || LINEAR || — || align=right data-sort-value="0.99" | 990 m || 
|-id=079 bgcolor=#E9E9E9
| 370079 ||  || — || September 20, 2001 || Socorro || LINEAR || — || align=right data-sort-value="0.77" | 770 m || 
|-id=080 bgcolor=#E9E9E9
| 370080 ||  || — || September 16, 2001 || Socorro || LINEAR || — || align=right | 1.1 km || 
|-id=081 bgcolor=#E9E9E9
| 370081 ||  || — || September 16, 2001 || Socorro || LINEAR || — || align=right | 1.1 km || 
|-id=082 bgcolor=#E9E9E9
| 370082 ||  || — || September 17, 2001 || Socorro || LINEAR || — || align=right | 1.1 km || 
|-id=083 bgcolor=#E9E9E9
| 370083 ||  || — || September 17, 2001 || Socorro || LINEAR || — || align=right | 1.2 km || 
|-id=084 bgcolor=#E9E9E9
| 370084 ||  || — || September 19, 2001 || Socorro || LINEAR || EUN || align=right | 1.3 km || 
|-id=085 bgcolor=#E9E9E9
| 370085 ||  || — || September 19, 2001 || Socorro || LINEAR || — || align=right data-sort-value="0.88" | 880 m || 
|-id=086 bgcolor=#E9E9E9
| 370086 ||  || — || September 19, 2001 || Socorro || LINEAR || — || align=right data-sort-value="0.90" | 900 m || 
|-id=087 bgcolor=#C2FFFF
| 370087 ||  || — || September 19, 2001 || Socorro || LINEAR || L5 || align=right | 9.0 km || 
|-id=088 bgcolor=#E9E9E9
| 370088 ||  || — || September 19, 2001 || Socorro || LINEAR || — || align=right data-sort-value="0.94" | 940 m || 
|-id=089 bgcolor=#E9E9E9
| 370089 ||  || — || September 19, 2001 || Socorro || LINEAR || — || align=right | 1.0 km || 
|-id=090 bgcolor=#E9E9E9
| 370090 ||  || — || September 19, 2001 || Socorro || LINEAR || — || align=right data-sort-value="0.93" | 930 m || 
|-id=091 bgcolor=#d6d6d6
| 370091 ||  || — || September 20, 2001 || Kitt Peak || Spacewatch || — || align=right | 4.6 km || 
|-id=092 bgcolor=#E9E9E9
| 370092 ||  || — || September 20, 2001 || Socorro || LINEAR || — || align=right data-sort-value="0.74" | 740 m || 
|-id=093 bgcolor=#E9E9E9
| 370093 ||  || — || September 23, 2001 || Socorro || LINEAR || — || align=right data-sort-value="0.71" | 710 m || 
|-id=094 bgcolor=#E9E9E9
| 370094 ||  || — || September 19, 2001 || Palomar || NEAT || — || align=right | 1.7 km || 
|-id=095 bgcolor=#E9E9E9
| 370095 ||  || — || September 20, 2001 || Kitt Peak || Spacewatch || — || align=right data-sort-value="0.60" | 600 m || 
|-id=096 bgcolor=#E9E9E9
| 370096 ||  || — || October 10, 2001 || Palomar || NEAT || KAZ || align=right | 1.2 km || 
|-id=097 bgcolor=#E9E9E9
| 370097 ||  || — || October 13, 2001 || Socorro || LINEAR || JUL || align=right | 1.5 km || 
|-id=098 bgcolor=#E9E9E9
| 370098 ||  || — || October 14, 2001 || Socorro || LINEAR || — || align=right data-sort-value="0.84" | 840 m || 
|-id=099 bgcolor=#E9E9E9
| 370099 ||  || — || October 13, 2001 || Socorro || LINEAR || — || align=right data-sort-value="0.98" | 980 m || 
|-id=100 bgcolor=#E9E9E9
| 370100 ||  || — || October 13, 2001 || Socorro || LINEAR || — || align=right | 1.6 km || 
|}

370101–370200 

|-bgcolor=#E9E9E9
| 370101 ||  || — || October 14, 2001 || Socorro || LINEAR || — || align=right data-sort-value="0.93" | 930 m || 
|-id=102 bgcolor=#E9E9E9
| 370102 ||  || — || October 14, 2001 || Socorro || LINEAR || — || align=right | 1.3 km || 
|-id=103 bgcolor=#E9E9E9
| 370103 ||  || — || October 14, 2001 || Socorro || LINEAR || — || align=right data-sort-value="0.98" | 980 m || 
|-id=104 bgcolor=#E9E9E9
| 370104 ||  || — || October 14, 2001 || Socorro || LINEAR || — || align=right | 1.2 km || 
|-id=105 bgcolor=#C2FFFF
| 370105 ||  || — || October 11, 2001 || Palomar || NEAT || L5 || align=right | 15 km || 
|-id=106 bgcolor=#E9E9E9
| 370106 ||  || — || October 14, 2001 || Kitt Peak || Spacewatch || — || align=right data-sort-value="0.58" | 580 m || 
|-id=107 bgcolor=#E9E9E9
| 370107 ||  || — || October 11, 2001 || Palomar || NEAT || — || align=right data-sort-value="0.87" | 870 m || 
|-id=108 bgcolor=#E9E9E9
| 370108 ||  || — || October 14, 2001 || Socorro || LINEAR || — || align=right data-sort-value="0.85" | 850 m || 
|-id=109 bgcolor=#E9E9E9
| 370109 ||  || — || October 13, 2001 || Palomar || NEAT || MAR || align=right | 1.2 km || 
|-id=110 bgcolor=#E9E9E9
| 370110 ||  || — || October 13, 2001 || Palomar || NEAT || — || align=right data-sort-value="0.70" | 700 m || 
|-id=111 bgcolor=#E9E9E9
| 370111 ||  || — || October 14, 2001 || Socorro || LINEAR || — || align=right data-sort-value="0.87" | 870 m || 
|-id=112 bgcolor=#E9E9E9
| 370112 ||  || — || October 17, 2001 || Socorro || LINEAR || — || align=right | 1.4 km || 
|-id=113 bgcolor=#E9E9E9
| 370113 ||  || — || October 16, 2001 || Socorro || LINEAR || — || align=right | 1.1 km || 
|-id=114 bgcolor=#E9E9E9
| 370114 ||  || — || October 17, 2001 || Socorro || LINEAR || — || align=right | 1.1 km || 
|-id=115 bgcolor=#E9E9E9
| 370115 ||  || — || October 19, 2001 || Kitt Peak || Spacewatch || — || align=right data-sort-value="0.79" | 790 m || 
|-id=116 bgcolor=#E9E9E9
| 370116 ||  || — || October 20, 2001 || Socorro || LINEAR || — || align=right | 1.1 km || 
|-id=117 bgcolor=#E9E9E9
| 370117 ||  || — || October 20, 2001 || Socorro || LINEAR || — || align=right data-sort-value="0.86" | 860 m || 
|-id=118 bgcolor=#E9E9E9
| 370118 ||  || — || October 20, 2001 || Socorro || LINEAR || MAR || align=right | 1.8 km || 
|-id=119 bgcolor=#E9E9E9
| 370119 ||  || — || October 22, 2001 || Socorro || LINEAR || — || align=right | 1.3 km || 
|-id=120 bgcolor=#E9E9E9
| 370120 ||  || — || October 23, 2001 || Socorro || LINEAR || — || align=right | 1.3 km || 
|-id=121 bgcolor=#E9E9E9
| 370121 ||  || — || October 23, 2001 || Socorro || LINEAR || — || align=right data-sort-value="0.83" | 830 m || 
|-id=122 bgcolor=#E9E9E9
| 370122 ||  || — || October 16, 2001 || Palomar || NEAT || — || align=right data-sort-value="0.88" | 880 m || 
|-id=123 bgcolor=#E9E9E9
| 370123 ||  || — || November 7, 2001 || Socorro || LINEAR || — || align=right | 1.6 km || 
|-id=124 bgcolor=#E9E9E9
| 370124 ||  || — || November 9, 2001 || Socorro || LINEAR || — || align=right | 1.1 km || 
|-id=125 bgcolor=#E9E9E9
| 370125 ||  || — || November 11, 2001 || Socorro || LINEAR || — || align=right | 1.6 km || 
|-id=126 bgcolor=#E9E9E9
| 370126 ||  || — || November 11, 2001 || Socorro || LINEAR || — || align=right | 1.4 km || 
|-id=127 bgcolor=#d6d6d6
| 370127 ||  || — || November 15, 2001 || Socorro || LINEAR || 7:4 || align=right | 2.9 km || 
|-id=128 bgcolor=#E9E9E9
| 370128 ||  || — || November 12, 2001 || Socorro || LINEAR || — || align=right data-sort-value="0.99" | 990 m || 
|-id=129 bgcolor=#E9E9E9
| 370129 ||  || — || November 12, 2001 || Socorro || LINEAR || — || align=right | 1.1 km || 
|-id=130 bgcolor=#E9E9E9
| 370130 ||  || — || November 12, 2001 || Socorro || LINEAR || — || align=right | 1.7 km || 
|-id=131 bgcolor=#E9E9E9
| 370131 ||  || — || November 9, 2001 || Socorro || LINEAR || — || align=right | 1.3 km || 
|-id=132 bgcolor=#E9E9E9
| 370132 ||  || — || November 11, 2001 || Apache Point || SDSS || — || align=right data-sort-value="0.59" | 590 m || 
|-id=133 bgcolor=#E9E9E9
| 370133 ||  || — || November 11, 2001 || Apache Point || SDSS || MAR || align=right data-sort-value="0.81" | 810 m || 
|-id=134 bgcolor=#E9E9E9
| 370134 ||  || — || November 17, 2001 || Socorro || LINEAR || — || align=right data-sort-value="0.91" | 910 m || 
|-id=135 bgcolor=#E9E9E9
| 370135 ||  || — || November 17, 2001 || Socorro || LINEAR || — || align=right data-sort-value="0.91" | 910 m || 
|-id=136 bgcolor=#E9E9E9
| 370136 ||  || — || November 17, 2001 || Socorro || LINEAR || — || align=right | 1.7 km || 
|-id=137 bgcolor=#E9E9E9
| 370137 ||  || — || November 19, 2001 || Socorro || LINEAR || — || align=right | 1.6 km || 
|-id=138 bgcolor=#E9E9E9
| 370138 ||  || — || November 20, 2001 || Socorro || LINEAR || — || align=right data-sort-value="0.71" | 710 m || 
|-id=139 bgcolor=#E9E9E9
| 370139 ||  || — || November 20, 2001 || Socorro || LINEAR || — || align=right | 1.0 km || 
|-id=140 bgcolor=#E9E9E9
| 370140 ||  || — || November 16, 2001 || Kitt Peak || Spacewatch || — || align=right | 1.5 km || 
|-id=141 bgcolor=#E9E9E9
| 370141 ||  || — || December 9, 2001 || Socorro || LINEAR || — || align=right | 1.8 km || 
|-id=142 bgcolor=#E9E9E9
| 370142 ||  || — || December 9, 2001 || Socorro || LINEAR || — || align=right | 1.4 km || 
|-id=143 bgcolor=#E9E9E9
| 370143 ||  || — || December 11, 2001 || Socorro || LINEAR || — || align=right | 1.6 km || 
|-id=144 bgcolor=#E9E9E9
| 370144 ||  || — || December 10, 2001 || Socorro || LINEAR || — || align=right data-sort-value="0.91" | 910 m || 
|-id=145 bgcolor=#E9E9E9
| 370145 ||  || — || December 10, 2001 || Socorro || LINEAR || — || align=right | 1.3 km || 
|-id=146 bgcolor=#E9E9E9
| 370146 ||  || — || December 10, 2001 || Socorro || LINEAR || — || align=right | 1.1 km || 
|-id=147 bgcolor=#E9E9E9
| 370147 ||  || — || December 11, 2001 || Socorro || LINEAR || ADE || align=right | 2.8 km || 
|-id=148 bgcolor=#E9E9E9
| 370148 ||  || — || December 14, 2001 || Socorro || LINEAR || — || align=right | 1.5 km || 
|-id=149 bgcolor=#E9E9E9
| 370149 ||  || — || December 14, 2001 || Socorro || LINEAR || — || align=right | 1.4 km || 
|-id=150 bgcolor=#E9E9E9
| 370150 ||  || — || December 14, 2001 || Socorro || LINEAR || — || align=right | 1.2 km || 
|-id=151 bgcolor=#E9E9E9
| 370151 ||  || — || December 13, 2001 || Socorro || LINEAR || — || align=right | 1.3 km || 
|-id=152 bgcolor=#E9E9E9
| 370152 ||  || — || December 15, 2001 || Socorro || LINEAR || — || align=right | 1.3 km || 
|-id=153 bgcolor=#E9E9E9
| 370153 ||  || — || December 15, 2001 || Socorro || LINEAR || — || align=right | 1.8 km || 
|-id=154 bgcolor=#E9E9E9
| 370154 ||  || — || December 8, 2001 || Anderson Mesa || LONEOS || — || align=right data-sort-value="0.84" | 840 m || 
|-id=155 bgcolor=#E9E9E9
| 370155 ||  || — || December 7, 2001 || Kitt Peak || Spacewatch || — || align=right | 1.1 km || 
|-id=156 bgcolor=#E9E9E9
| 370156 ||  || — || December 23, 2001 || Socorro || LINEAR || — || align=right | 1.7 km || 
|-id=157 bgcolor=#E9E9E9
| 370157 ||  || — || December 18, 2001 || Socorro || LINEAR || — || align=right | 1.7 km || 
|-id=158 bgcolor=#E9E9E9
| 370158 ||  || — || December 18, 2001 || Socorro || LINEAR || JUN || align=right | 1.1 km || 
|-id=159 bgcolor=#E9E9E9
| 370159 ||  || — || December 17, 2001 || Socorro || LINEAR || — || align=right data-sort-value="0.98" | 980 m || 
|-id=160 bgcolor=#E9E9E9
| 370160 ||  || — || December 17, 2001 || Socorro || LINEAR || — || align=right data-sort-value="0.96" | 960 m || 
|-id=161 bgcolor=#E9E9E9
| 370161 ||  || — || December 20, 2001 || Socorro || LINEAR || EUN || align=right | 1.7 km || 
|-id=162 bgcolor=#E9E9E9
| 370162 ||  || — || December 19, 2001 || Palomar || NEAT || — || align=right | 1.3 km || 
|-id=163 bgcolor=#E9E9E9
| 370163 ||  || — || December 20, 2001 || Palomar || NEAT || JUN || align=right | 1.3 km || 
|-id=164 bgcolor=#E9E9E9
| 370164 ||  || — || January 4, 2002 || Kitt Peak || Spacewatch || — || align=right | 1.6 km || 
|-id=165 bgcolor=#E9E9E9
| 370165 ||  || — || January 8, 2002 || Socorro || LINEAR || — || align=right | 1.6 km || 
|-id=166 bgcolor=#E9E9E9
| 370166 ||  || — || December 19, 2001 || Socorro || LINEAR || — || align=right | 1.5 km || 
|-id=167 bgcolor=#E9E9E9
| 370167 ||  || — || January 8, 2002 || Socorro || LINEAR || — || align=right | 1.3 km || 
|-id=168 bgcolor=#E9E9E9
| 370168 ||  || — || January 9, 2002 || Socorro || LINEAR || — || align=right | 1.8 km || 
|-id=169 bgcolor=#E9E9E9
| 370169 ||  || — || January 8, 2002 || Socorro || LINEAR || — || align=right | 1.1 km || 
|-id=170 bgcolor=#E9E9E9
| 370170 ||  || — || December 19, 2001 || Kitt Peak || Spacewatch || — || align=right | 2.4 km || 
|-id=171 bgcolor=#E9E9E9
| 370171 ||  || — || January 13, 2002 || Socorro || LINEAR || — || align=right | 2.0 km || 
|-id=172 bgcolor=#E9E9E9
| 370172 ||  || — || January 13, 2002 || Socorro || LINEAR || — || align=right | 1.6 km || 
|-id=173 bgcolor=#E9E9E9
| 370173 ||  || — || January 14, 2002 || Socorro || LINEAR || JUN || align=right | 1.6 km || 
|-id=174 bgcolor=#E9E9E9
| 370174 ||  || — || January 13, 2002 || Socorro || LINEAR || RAF || align=right | 1.2 km || 
|-id=175 bgcolor=#E9E9E9
| 370175 ||  || — || January 23, 2002 || Socorro || LINEAR || ADE || align=right | 2.5 km || 
|-id=176 bgcolor=#E9E9E9
| 370176 ||  || — || January 23, 2002 || Socorro || LINEAR || JUN || align=right | 2.4 km || 
|-id=177 bgcolor=#E9E9E9
| 370177 ||  || — || January 26, 2002 || Socorro || LINEAR || — || align=right | 1.3 km || 
|-id=178 bgcolor=#FA8072
| 370178 ||  || — || February 4, 2002 || Črni Vrh || Črni Vrh || — || align=right | 1.3 km || 
|-id=179 bgcolor=#E9E9E9
| 370179 ||  || — || February 6, 2002 || Socorro || LINEAR || EUN || align=right | 1.6 km || 
|-id=180 bgcolor=#E9E9E9
| 370180 ||  || — || February 6, 2002 || Socorro || LINEAR || — || align=right | 1.3 km || 
|-id=181 bgcolor=#FA8072
| 370181 ||  || — || February 11, 2002 || Socorro || LINEAR || — || align=right | 1.3 km || 
|-id=182 bgcolor=#E9E9E9
| 370182 ||  || — || February 6, 2002 || Socorro || LINEAR || — || align=right | 1.1 km || 
|-id=183 bgcolor=#E9E9E9
| 370183 ||  || — || February 6, 2002 || Socorro || LINEAR || JUN || align=right | 1.6 km || 
|-id=184 bgcolor=#E9E9E9
| 370184 ||  || — || February 7, 2002 || Socorro || LINEAR || — || align=right | 2.6 km || 
|-id=185 bgcolor=#E9E9E9
| 370185 ||  || — || February 7, 2002 || Socorro || LINEAR || — || align=right | 3.6 km || 
|-id=186 bgcolor=#E9E9E9
| 370186 ||  || — || February 11, 2002 || Eskridge || G. Hug || — || align=right | 2.0 km || 
|-id=187 bgcolor=#E9E9E9
| 370187 ||  || — || February 8, 2002 || Socorro || LINEAR || — || align=right | 1.5 km || 
|-id=188 bgcolor=#E9E9E9
| 370188 ||  || — || February 10, 2002 || Socorro || LINEAR || BRG || align=right | 1.9 km || 
|-id=189 bgcolor=#E9E9E9
| 370189 ||  || — || February 10, 2002 || Socorro || LINEAR || ADE || align=right | 2.3 km || 
|-id=190 bgcolor=#E9E9E9
| 370190 ||  || — || February 10, 2002 || Socorro || LINEAR || — || align=right | 2.5 km || 
|-id=191 bgcolor=#E9E9E9
| 370191 ||  || — || February 10, 2002 || Socorro || LINEAR || — || align=right | 1.8 km || 
|-id=192 bgcolor=#E9E9E9
| 370192 ||  || — || February 10, 2002 || Socorro || LINEAR || — || align=right | 2.8 km || 
|-id=193 bgcolor=#E9E9E9
| 370193 ||  || — || February 10, 2002 || Socorro || LINEAR || — || align=right | 2.8 km || 
|-id=194 bgcolor=#E9E9E9
| 370194 ||  || — || February 10, 2002 || Socorro || LINEAR || — || align=right | 2.0 km || 
|-id=195 bgcolor=#E9E9E9
| 370195 ||  || — || February 15, 2002 || Cerro Tololo || DLS || JUN || align=right data-sort-value="0.88" | 880 m || 
|-id=196 bgcolor=#E9E9E9
| 370196 ||  || — || February 4, 2002 || Cima Ekar || ADAS || ADE || align=right | 3.0 km || 
|-id=197 bgcolor=#E9E9E9
| 370197 ||  || — || February 10, 2002 || Socorro || LINEAR || — || align=right | 3.4 km || 
|-id=198 bgcolor=#E9E9E9
| 370198 ||  || — || February 12, 2002 || Cima Ekar || ADAS || — || align=right | 2.3 km || 
|-id=199 bgcolor=#FA8072
| 370199 ||  || — || February 20, 2002 || Socorro || LINEAR || — || align=right | 2.8 km || 
|-id=200 bgcolor=#E9E9E9
| 370200 ||  || — || February 16, 2002 || Palomar || NEAT || — || align=right | 2.7 km || 
|}

370201–370300 

|-bgcolor=#E9E9E9
| 370201 ||  || — || March 11, 2002 || Ondřejov || P. Kušnirák || — || align=right | 2.3 km || 
|-id=202 bgcolor=#E9E9E9
| 370202 ||  || — || March 5, 2002 || Kitt Peak || Spacewatch || — || align=right | 2.2 km || 
|-id=203 bgcolor=#E9E9E9
| 370203 ||  || — || March 9, 2002 || Kitt Peak || Spacewatch || — || align=right | 1.9 km || 
|-id=204 bgcolor=#E9E9E9
| 370204 ||  || — || March 10, 2002 || Kitt Peak || Spacewatch || — || align=right | 3.2 km || 
|-id=205 bgcolor=#E9E9E9
| 370205 ||  || — || March 12, 2002 || Palomar || NEAT || — || align=right | 1.9 km || 
|-id=206 bgcolor=#fefefe
| 370206 ||  || — || March 16, 2002 || Socorro || LINEAR || H || align=right data-sort-value="0.48" | 480 m || 
|-id=207 bgcolor=#E9E9E9
| 370207 ||  || — || March 19, 2002 || Anderson Mesa || LONEOS || DOR || align=right | 3.1 km || 
|-id=208 bgcolor=#fefefe
| 370208 ||  || — || April 8, 2002 || Palomar || NEAT || — || align=right data-sort-value="0.70" | 700 m || 
|-id=209 bgcolor=#fefefe
| 370209 ||  || — || April 10, 2002 || Socorro || LINEAR || V || align=right data-sort-value="0.92" | 920 m || 
|-id=210 bgcolor=#fefefe
| 370210 ||  || — || April 12, 2002 || Palomar || NEAT || — || align=right | 1.0 km || 
|-id=211 bgcolor=#fefefe
| 370211 ||  || — || April 12, 2002 || Haleakala || NEAT || H || align=right data-sort-value="0.85" | 850 m || 
|-id=212 bgcolor=#FA8072
| 370212 ||  || — || April 14, 2002 || Socorro || LINEAR || — || align=right | 1.1 km || 
|-id=213 bgcolor=#fefefe
| 370213 ||  || — || April 14, 2002 || Palomar || NEAT || — || align=right data-sort-value="0.84" | 840 m || 
|-id=214 bgcolor=#E9E9E9
| 370214 ||  || — || April 14, 2002 || Palomar || M. White, M. Collins || — || align=right | 3.7 km || 
|-id=215 bgcolor=#fefefe
| 370215 ||  || — || May 7, 2002 || Palomar || NEAT || — || align=right data-sort-value="0.73" | 730 m || 
|-id=216 bgcolor=#fefefe
| 370216 ||  || — || May 13, 2002 || Socorro || LINEAR || — || align=right data-sort-value="0.76" | 760 m || 
|-id=217 bgcolor=#fefefe
| 370217 ||  || — || May 1, 2002 || Palomar || NEAT || — || align=right data-sort-value="0.72" | 720 m || 
|-id=218 bgcolor=#d6d6d6
| 370218 ||  || — || June 2, 2002 || Palomar || NEAT || DUR || align=right | 4.1 km || 
|-id=219 bgcolor=#d6d6d6
| 370219 ||  || — || June 6, 2002 || Socorro || LINEAR || IMH || align=right | 5.2 km || 
|-id=220 bgcolor=#fefefe
| 370220 ||  || — || July 14, 2002 || Palomar || NEAT || — || align=right data-sort-value="0.71" | 710 m || 
|-id=221 bgcolor=#d6d6d6
| 370221 ||  || — || July 4, 2002 || Palomar || NEAT || — || align=right | 3.5 km || 
|-id=222 bgcolor=#d6d6d6
| 370222 ||  || — || July 15, 2002 || Palomar || NEAT || — || align=right | 3.9 km || 
|-id=223 bgcolor=#d6d6d6
| 370223 ||  || — || July 9, 2002 || Palomar || NEAT || — || align=right | 2.9 km || 
|-id=224 bgcolor=#d6d6d6
| 370224 ||  || — || July 14, 2002 || Palomar || NEAT || — || align=right | 2.9 km || 
|-id=225 bgcolor=#d6d6d6
| 370225 ||  || — || July 17, 2002 || Socorro || LINEAR || — || align=right | 4.0 km || 
|-id=226 bgcolor=#d6d6d6
| 370226 ||  || — || July 26, 2002 || Palomar || NEAT || — || align=right | 3.6 km || 
|-id=227 bgcolor=#d6d6d6
| 370227 ||  || — || July 22, 2002 || Palomar || NEAT || EOS || align=right | 2.5 km || 
|-id=228 bgcolor=#d6d6d6
| 370228 ||  || — || August 6, 2002 || Palomar || NEAT || — || align=right | 3.7 km || 
|-id=229 bgcolor=#fefefe
| 370229 ||  || — || August 8, 2002 || Palomar || NEAT || V || align=right data-sort-value="0.84" | 840 m || 
|-id=230 bgcolor=#d6d6d6
| 370230 ||  || — || August 2, 2002 || Campo Imperatore || CINEOS || — || align=right | 3.8 km || 
|-id=231 bgcolor=#d6d6d6
| 370231 ||  || — || August 13, 2002 || Needville || Needville Obs. || — || align=right | 2.8 km || 
|-id=232 bgcolor=#fefefe
| 370232 ||  || — || August 13, 2002 || Palomar || NEAT || — || align=right | 1.4 km || 
|-id=233 bgcolor=#fefefe
| 370233 ||  || — || August 13, 2002 || Socorro || LINEAR || — || align=right | 1.4 km || 
|-id=234 bgcolor=#d6d6d6
| 370234 ||  || — || August 12, 2002 || Socorro || LINEAR || — || align=right | 3.6 km || 
|-id=235 bgcolor=#d6d6d6
| 370235 ||  || — || August 13, 2002 || Socorro || LINEAR || — || align=right | 4.3 km || 
|-id=236 bgcolor=#fefefe
| 370236 ||  || — || August 14, 2002 || Anderson Mesa || LONEOS || — || align=right data-sort-value="0.63" | 630 m || 
|-id=237 bgcolor=#fefefe
| 370237 ||  || — || August 15, 2002 || Palomar || NEAT || — || align=right data-sort-value="0.66" | 660 m || 
|-id=238 bgcolor=#fefefe
| 370238 ||  || — || August 6, 2002 || Palomar || NEAT || NYS || align=right data-sort-value="0.71" | 710 m || 
|-id=239 bgcolor=#fefefe
| 370239 ||  || — || August 8, 2002 || Palomar || S. F. Hönig || — || align=right data-sort-value="0.69" | 690 m || 
|-id=240 bgcolor=#fefefe
| 370240 ||  || — || August 8, 2002 || Palomar || S. F. Hönig || MAS || align=right data-sort-value="0.72" | 720 m || 
|-id=241 bgcolor=#fefefe
| 370241 ||  || — || August 8, 2002 || Palomar || S. F. Hönig || MAS || align=right data-sort-value="0.72" | 720 m || 
|-id=242 bgcolor=#fefefe
| 370242 ||  || — || August 8, 2002 || Palomar || S. F. Hönig || MAS || align=right data-sort-value="0.73" | 730 m || 
|-id=243 bgcolor=#d6d6d6
| 370243 ||  || — || August 8, 2002 || Palomar || NEAT || — || align=right | 2.9 km || 
|-id=244 bgcolor=#d6d6d6
| 370244 ||  || — || August 8, 2002 || Palomar || NEAT || — || align=right | 4.2 km || 
|-id=245 bgcolor=#d6d6d6
| 370245 ||  || — || August 8, 2002 || Palomar || NEAT || — || align=right | 2.6 km || 
|-id=246 bgcolor=#fefefe
| 370246 ||  || — || August 7, 2002 || Palomar || NEAT || NYS || align=right data-sort-value="0.50" | 500 m || 
|-id=247 bgcolor=#d6d6d6
| 370247 ||  || — || August 15, 2002 || Palomar || NEAT || EMA || align=right | 5.4 km || 
|-id=248 bgcolor=#d6d6d6
| 370248 ||  || — || August 15, 2002 || Palomar || NEAT || — || align=right | 3.4 km || 
|-id=249 bgcolor=#fefefe
| 370249 ||  || — || August 7, 2002 || Palomar || NEAT || ERI || align=right | 1.6 km || 
|-id=250 bgcolor=#d6d6d6
| 370250 ||  || — || August 15, 2002 || Palomar || NEAT || — || align=right | 2.4 km || 
|-id=251 bgcolor=#d6d6d6
| 370251 ||  || — || August 15, 2002 || Palomar || NEAT || URS || align=right | 3.9 km || 
|-id=252 bgcolor=#fefefe
| 370252 ||  || — || August 11, 2002 || Palomar || NEAT || MAS || align=right data-sort-value="0.63" | 630 m || 
|-id=253 bgcolor=#fefefe
| 370253 ||  || — || August 11, 2002 || Palomar || NEAT || — || align=right data-sort-value="0.83" | 830 m || 
|-id=254 bgcolor=#d6d6d6
| 370254 ||  || — || August 11, 2002 || Palomar || NEAT || — || align=right | 2.6 km || 
|-id=255 bgcolor=#d6d6d6
| 370255 ||  || — || August 11, 2002 || Palomar || NEAT || — || align=right | 2.4 km || 
|-id=256 bgcolor=#fefefe
| 370256 ||  || — || August 8, 2002 || Palomar || NEAT || NYS || align=right data-sort-value="0.50" | 500 m || 
|-id=257 bgcolor=#fefefe
| 370257 ||  || — || August 8, 2002 || Palomar || NEAT || NYS || align=right data-sort-value="0.64" | 640 m || 
|-id=258 bgcolor=#fefefe
| 370258 ||  || — || August 16, 2002 || Palomar || NEAT || ERI || align=right | 1.3 km || 
|-id=259 bgcolor=#fefefe
| 370259 ||  || — || August 16, 2002 || Palomar || NEAT || — || align=right data-sort-value="0.99" | 990 m || 
|-id=260 bgcolor=#fefefe
| 370260 ||  || — || August 26, 2002 || Palomar || NEAT || MAS || align=right data-sort-value="0.76" | 760 m || 
|-id=261 bgcolor=#E9E9E9
| 370261 ||  || — || August 27, 2002 || Palomar || NEAT || — || align=right | 1.3 km || 
|-id=262 bgcolor=#d6d6d6
| 370262 ||  || — || August 29, 2002 || Palomar || NEAT || Tj (2.96) || align=right | 3.1 km || 
|-id=263 bgcolor=#fefefe
| 370263 ||  || — || August 29, 2002 || Palomar || NEAT || — || align=right data-sort-value="0.94" | 940 m || 
|-id=264 bgcolor=#fefefe
| 370264 ||  || — || August 29, 2002 || Palomar || NEAT || MAS || align=right data-sort-value="0.65" | 650 m || 
|-id=265 bgcolor=#d6d6d6
| 370265 ||  || — || August 30, 2002 || Kitt Peak || Spacewatch || — || align=right | 3.7 km || 
|-id=266 bgcolor=#d6d6d6
| 370266 ||  || — || August 30, 2002 || Kitt Peak || Spacewatch || — || align=right | 3.2 km || 
|-id=267 bgcolor=#d6d6d6
| 370267 ||  || — || August 29, 2002 || Palomar || R. Matson || — || align=right | 4.2 km || 
|-id=268 bgcolor=#fefefe
| 370268 ||  || — || August 18, 2002 || Palomar || S. F. Hönig || NYS || align=right data-sort-value="0.69" | 690 m || 
|-id=269 bgcolor=#d6d6d6
| 370269 ||  || — || August 29, 2002 || Palomar || S. F. Hönig || — || align=right | 3.4 km || 
|-id=270 bgcolor=#d6d6d6
| 370270 ||  || — || August 29, 2002 || Palomar || S. F. Hönig || — || align=right | 3.4 km || 
|-id=271 bgcolor=#d6d6d6
| 370271 ||  || — || August 18, 2002 || Palomar || S. F. Hönig || HYG || align=right | 3.3 km || 
|-id=272 bgcolor=#d6d6d6
| 370272 ||  || — || August 19, 2002 || Palomar || NEAT || — || align=right | 2.9 km || 
|-id=273 bgcolor=#d6d6d6
| 370273 ||  || — || August 26, 2002 || Palomar || NEAT || — || align=right | 3.4 km || 
|-id=274 bgcolor=#fefefe
| 370274 ||  || — || August 28, 2002 || Palomar || NEAT || FLO || align=right data-sort-value="0.82" | 820 m || 
|-id=275 bgcolor=#fefefe
| 370275 ||  || — || August 18, 2002 || Palomar || NEAT || — || align=right data-sort-value="0.81" | 810 m || 
|-id=276 bgcolor=#fefefe
| 370276 ||  || — || August 18, 2002 || Palomar || NEAT || — || align=right data-sort-value="0.74" | 740 m || 
|-id=277 bgcolor=#d6d6d6
| 370277 ||  || — || August 28, 2002 || Palomar || NEAT || HYG || align=right | 2.3 km || 
|-id=278 bgcolor=#d6d6d6
| 370278 ||  || — || August 18, 2002 || Palomar || NEAT || — || align=right | 2.8 km || 
|-id=279 bgcolor=#d6d6d6
| 370279 ||  || — || August 26, 2002 || Palomar || NEAT || — || align=right | 2.3 km || 
|-id=280 bgcolor=#fefefe
| 370280 ||  || — || August 16, 2002 || Palomar || NEAT || FLO || align=right data-sort-value="0.58" | 580 m || 
|-id=281 bgcolor=#d6d6d6
| 370281 ||  || — || August 27, 2002 || Palomar || NEAT || EOS || align=right | 1.9 km || 
|-id=282 bgcolor=#d6d6d6
| 370282 ||  || — || August 18, 2002 || Palomar || NEAT || — || align=right | 3.4 km || 
|-id=283 bgcolor=#fefefe
| 370283 ||  || — || August 29, 2002 || Palomar || NEAT || — || align=right data-sort-value="0.63" | 630 m || 
|-id=284 bgcolor=#fefefe
| 370284 ||  || — || August 18, 2002 || Palomar || NEAT || NYS || align=right data-sort-value="0.46" | 460 m || 
|-id=285 bgcolor=#fefefe
| 370285 ||  || — || August 29, 2002 || Palomar || NEAT || — || align=right data-sort-value="0.62" | 620 m || 
|-id=286 bgcolor=#d6d6d6
| 370286 ||  || — || August 26, 2002 || Palomar || NEAT || EOS || align=right | 2.1 km || 
|-id=287 bgcolor=#d6d6d6
| 370287 ||  || — || August 17, 2002 || Palomar || NEAT || — || align=right | 2.4 km || 
|-id=288 bgcolor=#fefefe
| 370288 ||  || — || August 17, 2002 || Palomar || NEAT || FLO || align=right data-sort-value="0.58" | 580 m || 
|-id=289 bgcolor=#d6d6d6
| 370289 ||  || — || August 16, 2002 || Palomar || NEAT || EOS || align=right | 2.3 km || 
|-id=290 bgcolor=#d6d6d6
| 370290 ||  || — || August 26, 2002 || Palomar || NEAT || HYG || align=right | 2.2 km || 
|-id=291 bgcolor=#d6d6d6
| 370291 ||  || — || August 16, 2002 || Kitt Peak || Spacewatch || URS || align=right | 4.5 km || 
|-id=292 bgcolor=#fefefe
| 370292 ||  || — || August 19, 2002 || Palomar || NEAT || ERI || align=right | 1.3 km || 
|-id=293 bgcolor=#d6d6d6
| 370293 ||  || — || August 30, 2002 || Palomar || NEAT || HYG || align=right | 2.5 km || 
|-id=294 bgcolor=#d6d6d6
| 370294 ||  || — || August 30, 2002 || Palomar || NEAT || HYG || align=right | 2.7 km || 
|-id=295 bgcolor=#fefefe
| 370295 ||  || — || August 17, 2002 || Palomar || NEAT || — || align=right data-sort-value="0.58" | 580 m || 
|-id=296 bgcolor=#d6d6d6
| 370296 ||  || — || August 27, 2002 || Palomar || NEAT || — || align=right | 3.0 km || 
|-id=297 bgcolor=#fefefe
| 370297 ||  || — || September 19, 1995 || Kitt Peak || Spacewatch || NYS || align=right data-sort-value="0.55" | 550 m || 
|-id=298 bgcolor=#fefefe
| 370298 ||  || — || September 2, 2002 || Drebach || T. Payer || H || align=right data-sort-value="0.64" | 640 m || 
|-id=299 bgcolor=#d6d6d6
| 370299 ||  || — || September 3, 2002 || Powell || Powell Obs. || EUP || align=right | 5.8 km || 
|-id=300 bgcolor=#fefefe
| 370300 ||  || — || September 4, 2002 || Palomar || NEAT || — || align=right data-sort-value="0.86" | 860 m || 
|}

370301–370400 

|-bgcolor=#fefefe
| 370301 ||  || — || September 4, 2002 || Anderson Mesa || LONEOS || V || align=right data-sort-value="0.82" | 820 m || 
|-id=302 bgcolor=#fefefe
| 370302 ||  || — || September 4, 2002 || Anderson Mesa || LONEOS || NYS || align=right data-sort-value="0.74" | 740 m || 
|-id=303 bgcolor=#fefefe
| 370303 ||  || — || September 4, 2002 || Anderson Mesa || LONEOS || MAS || align=right data-sort-value="0.78" | 780 m || 
|-id=304 bgcolor=#d6d6d6
| 370304 ||  || — || September 3, 2002 || Haleakala || NEAT || TIR || align=right | 3.4 km || 
|-id=305 bgcolor=#d6d6d6
| 370305 ||  || — || August 16, 2002 || Socorro || LINEAR || — || align=right | 3.4 km || 
|-id=306 bgcolor=#fefefe
| 370306 ||  || — || September 5, 2002 || Anderson Mesa || LONEOS || V || align=right data-sort-value="0.82" | 820 m || 
|-id=307 bgcolor=#FFC2E0
| 370307 ||  || — || September 5, 2002 || Socorro || LINEAR || APO +1km || align=right | 1.5 km || 
|-id=308 bgcolor=#d6d6d6
| 370308 ||  || — || September 3, 2002 || Haleakala || NEAT || — || align=right | 3.9 km || 
|-id=309 bgcolor=#d6d6d6
| 370309 ||  || — || September 4, 2002 || Anderson Mesa || LONEOS || — || align=right | 3.1 km || 
|-id=310 bgcolor=#fefefe
| 370310 ||  || — || September 4, 2002 || Anderson Mesa || LONEOS || V || align=right data-sort-value="0.74" | 740 m || 
|-id=311 bgcolor=#d6d6d6
| 370311 ||  || — || September 5, 2002 || Socorro || LINEAR || — || align=right | 3.9 km || 
|-id=312 bgcolor=#fefefe
| 370312 ||  || — || September 5, 2002 || Socorro || LINEAR || NYS || align=right data-sort-value="0.65" | 650 m || 
|-id=313 bgcolor=#fefefe
| 370313 ||  || — || September 5, 2002 || Socorro || LINEAR || V || align=right data-sort-value="0.71" | 710 m || 
|-id=314 bgcolor=#fefefe
| 370314 ||  || — || September 5, 2002 || Socorro || LINEAR || NYS || align=right data-sort-value="0.66" | 660 m || 
|-id=315 bgcolor=#d6d6d6
| 370315 ||  || — || September 6, 2002 || Socorro || LINEAR || — || align=right | 4.6 km || 
|-id=316 bgcolor=#fefefe
| 370316 ||  || — || September 3, 2002 || Campo Imperatore || CINEOS || ERI || align=right | 1.4 km || 
|-id=317 bgcolor=#d6d6d6
| 370317 ||  || — || September 7, 2002 || Socorro || LINEAR || — || align=right | 5.0 km || 
|-id=318 bgcolor=#d6d6d6
| 370318 ||  || — || September 11, 2002 || Palomar || NEAT || — || align=right | 3.6 km || 
|-id=319 bgcolor=#d6d6d6
| 370319 ||  || — || September 11, 2002 || Haleakala || NEAT || — || align=right | 3.9 km || 
|-id=320 bgcolor=#d6d6d6
| 370320 ||  || — || September 10, 2002 || Palomar || NEAT || — || align=right | 3.9 km || 
|-id=321 bgcolor=#d6d6d6
| 370321 ||  || — || September 11, 2002 || Palomar || NEAT || — || align=right | 3.6 km || 
|-id=322 bgcolor=#d6d6d6
| 370322 ||  || — || September 10, 2002 || Palomar || NEAT || — || align=right | 3.0 km || 
|-id=323 bgcolor=#fefefe
| 370323 ||  || — || September 11, 2002 || Palomar || NEAT || NYS || align=right data-sort-value="0.69" | 690 m || 
|-id=324 bgcolor=#d6d6d6
| 370324 ||  || — || September 11, 2002 || Palomar || NEAT || — || align=right | 2.8 km || 
|-id=325 bgcolor=#fefefe
| 370325 ||  || — || September 11, 2002 || Palomar || NEAT || NYS || align=right data-sort-value="0.68" | 680 m || 
|-id=326 bgcolor=#fefefe
| 370326 ||  || — || September 12, 2002 || Palomar || NEAT || V || align=right data-sort-value="0.71" | 710 m || 
|-id=327 bgcolor=#d6d6d6
| 370327 ||  || — || September 11, 2002 || Palomar || NEAT || — || align=right | 3.5 km || 
|-id=328 bgcolor=#fefefe
| 370328 ||  || — || September 12, 2002 || Palomar || NEAT || — || align=right data-sort-value="0.69" | 690 m || 
|-id=329 bgcolor=#fefefe
| 370329 ||  || — || September 12, 2002 || Palomar || NEAT || MAS || align=right data-sort-value="0.68" | 680 m || 
|-id=330 bgcolor=#fefefe
| 370330 ||  || — || September 13, 2002 || Palomar || NEAT || — || align=right data-sort-value="0.77" | 770 m || 
|-id=331 bgcolor=#d6d6d6
| 370331 ||  || — || September 12, 2002 || Palomar || NEAT || THM || align=right | 2.6 km || 
|-id=332 bgcolor=#d6d6d6
| 370332 ||  || — || September 15, 2002 || Haleakala || NEAT || — || align=right | 3.4 km || 
|-id=333 bgcolor=#d6d6d6
| 370333 ||  || — || September 15, 2002 || Haleakala || NEAT || — || align=right | 3.6 km || 
|-id=334 bgcolor=#d6d6d6
| 370334 ||  || — || September 15, 2002 || Haleakala || NEAT || LIX || align=right | 4.0 km || 
|-id=335 bgcolor=#fefefe
| 370335 ||  || — || September 15, 2002 || Palomar || R. Matson || NYS || align=right data-sort-value="0.70" | 700 m || 
|-id=336 bgcolor=#d6d6d6
| 370336 ||  || — || April 13, 2001 || Kitt Peak || Spacewatch || — || align=right | 3.1 km || 
|-id=337 bgcolor=#d6d6d6
| 370337 ||  || — || September 3, 2002 || Palomar || NEAT || — || align=right | 4.2 km || 
|-id=338 bgcolor=#d6d6d6
| 370338 ||  || — || September 12, 2002 || Palomar || NEAT || EOS || align=right | 2.2 km || 
|-id=339 bgcolor=#fefefe
| 370339 ||  || — || September 1, 2002 || Palomar || NEAT || MAS || align=right data-sort-value="0.54" | 540 m || 
|-id=340 bgcolor=#d6d6d6
| 370340 ||  || — || September 4, 2002 || Palomar || NEAT || EOS || align=right | 1.8 km || 
|-id=341 bgcolor=#fefefe
| 370341 ||  || — || September 15, 2002 || Palomar || NEAT || NYS || align=right data-sort-value="0.63" | 630 m || 
|-id=342 bgcolor=#d6d6d6
| 370342 ||  || — || September 14, 2002 || Palomar || NEAT || HYG || align=right | 2.9 km || 
|-id=343 bgcolor=#d6d6d6
| 370343 ||  || — || September 11, 2002 || Palomar || NEAT || ELF || align=right | 3.4 km || 
|-id=344 bgcolor=#d6d6d6
| 370344 ||  || — || September 13, 2002 || Palomar || Palomar Obs. || ALA || align=right | 5.2 km || 
|-id=345 bgcolor=#d6d6d6
| 370345 ||  || — || September 13, 2002 || Palomar || NEAT || HYG || align=right | 3.1 km || 
|-id=346 bgcolor=#d6d6d6
| 370346 ||  || — || September 13, 2002 || Palomar || NEAT || EOS || align=right | 2.0 km || 
|-id=347 bgcolor=#d6d6d6
| 370347 ||  || — || September 3, 2002 || Palomar || NEAT || — || align=right | 3.3 km || 
|-id=348 bgcolor=#d6d6d6
| 370348 ||  || — || September 14, 2002 || Palomar || NEAT || — || align=right | 4.1 km || 
|-id=349 bgcolor=#d6d6d6
| 370349 ||  || — || September 4, 2002 || Palomar || NEAT || — || align=right | 3.8 km || 
|-id=350 bgcolor=#d6d6d6
| 370350 ||  || — || September 4, 2002 || Palomar || NEAT || — || align=right | 3.8 km || 
|-id=351 bgcolor=#d6d6d6
| 370351 ||  || — || September 4, 2002 || Palomar || NEAT || EOS || align=right | 3.4 km || 
|-id=352 bgcolor=#d6d6d6
| 370352 ||  || — || September 4, 2002 || Palomar || NEAT || — || align=right | 3.1 km || 
|-id=353 bgcolor=#fefefe
| 370353 ||  || — || September 15, 2002 || Palomar || NEAT || — || align=right data-sort-value="0.74" | 740 m || 
|-id=354 bgcolor=#fefefe
| 370354 ||  || — || September 15, 2002 || Palomar || NEAT || MAS || align=right data-sort-value="0.58" | 580 m || 
|-id=355 bgcolor=#d6d6d6
| 370355 ||  || — || September 12, 2002 || Palomar || NEAT || — || align=right | 3.9 km || 
|-id=356 bgcolor=#d6d6d6
| 370356 ||  || — || September 12, 2002 || Palomar || NEAT || — || align=right | 5.1 km || 
|-id=357 bgcolor=#d6d6d6
| 370357 ||  || — || September 26, 2002 || Palomar || NEAT || — || align=right | 4.1 km || 
|-id=358 bgcolor=#fefefe
| 370358 ||  || — || September 28, 2002 || Haleakala || NEAT || NYS || align=right data-sort-value="0.65" | 650 m || 
|-id=359 bgcolor=#fefefe
| 370359 ||  || — || September 29, 2002 || Haleakala || NEAT || — || align=right data-sort-value="0.97" | 970 m || 
|-id=360 bgcolor=#d6d6d6
| 370360 ||  || — || September 28, 2002 || Palomar || NEAT || — || align=right | 4.1 km || 
|-id=361 bgcolor=#fefefe
| 370361 ||  || — || September 30, 2002 || Socorro || LINEAR || — || align=right data-sort-value="0.87" | 870 m || 
|-id=362 bgcolor=#d6d6d6
| 370362 ||  || — || September 17, 2002 || Palomar || NEAT || — || align=right | 3.6 km || 
|-id=363 bgcolor=#d6d6d6
| 370363 ||  || — || September 27, 2002 || Palomar || NEAT || — || align=right | 3.7 km || 
|-id=364 bgcolor=#fefefe
| 370364 ||  || — || September 26, 2002 || Palomar || NEAT || NYS || align=right data-sort-value="0.51" | 510 m || 
|-id=365 bgcolor=#d6d6d6
| 370365 ||  || — || September 16, 2002 || Palomar || NEAT || — || align=right | 2.7 km || 
|-id=366 bgcolor=#d6d6d6
| 370366 ||  || — || October 1, 2002 || Anderson Mesa || LONEOS || TIR || align=right | 3.9 km || 
|-id=367 bgcolor=#fefefe
| 370367 ||  || — || October 1, 2002 || Haleakala || NEAT || — || align=right data-sort-value="0.98" | 980 m || 
|-id=368 bgcolor=#fefefe
| 370368 ||  || — || October 1, 2002 || Haleakala || NEAT || V || align=right data-sort-value="0.79" | 790 m || 
|-id=369 bgcolor=#fefefe
| 370369 ||  || — || October 2, 2002 || Socorro || LINEAR || NYS || align=right data-sort-value="0.69" | 690 m || 
|-id=370 bgcolor=#d6d6d6
| 370370 ||  || — || October 2, 2002 || Socorro || LINEAR || LIX || align=right | 6.1 km || 
|-id=371 bgcolor=#fefefe
| 370371 ||  || — || October 2, 2002 || Socorro || LINEAR || NYS || align=right data-sort-value="0.77" | 770 m || 
|-id=372 bgcolor=#d6d6d6
| 370372 ||  || — || October 2, 2002 || Socorro || LINEAR || TIR || align=right | 3.3 km || 
|-id=373 bgcolor=#fefefe
| 370373 ||  || — || October 2, 2002 || Socorro || LINEAR || NYS || align=right | 1.1 km || 
|-id=374 bgcolor=#fefefe
| 370374 ||  || — || October 2, 2002 || Socorro || LINEAR || ERI || align=right | 2.0 km || 
|-id=375 bgcolor=#d6d6d6
| 370375 ||  || — || October 1, 2002 || Anderson Mesa || LONEOS || — || align=right | 3.6 km || 
|-id=376 bgcolor=#d6d6d6
| 370376 ||  || — || October 2, 2002 || Haleakala || NEAT || ALA || align=right | 3.6 km || 
|-id=377 bgcolor=#d6d6d6
| 370377 ||  || — || October 3, 2002 || Socorro || LINEAR || — || align=right | 4.2 km || 
|-id=378 bgcolor=#d6d6d6
| 370378 ||  || — || October 3, 2002 || Socorro || LINEAR || — || align=right | 3.0 km || 
|-id=379 bgcolor=#d6d6d6
| 370379 ||  || — || October 4, 2002 || Campo Imperatore || CINEOS || THM || align=right | 3.0 km || 
|-id=380 bgcolor=#d6d6d6
| 370380 ||  || — || October 3, 2002 || Palomar || NEAT || EUP || align=right | 4.7 km || 
|-id=381 bgcolor=#d6d6d6
| 370381 ||  || — || October 3, 2002 || Campo Imperatore || CINEOS || EUP || align=right | 5.1 km || 
|-id=382 bgcolor=#d6d6d6
| 370382 ||  || — || October 4, 2002 || Palomar || NEAT || — || align=right | 4.3 km || 
|-id=383 bgcolor=#fefefe
| 370383 ||  || — || October 4, 2002 || Palomar || NEAT || H || align=right data-sort-value="0.65" | 650 m || 
|-id=384 bgcolor=#fefefe
| 370384 ||  || — || October 4, 2002 || Socorro || LINEAR || — || align=right data-sort-value="0.99" | 990 m || 
|-id=385 bgcolor=#d6d6d6
| 370385 ||  || — || October 4, 2002 || Palomar || NEAT || — || align=right | 3.4 km || 
|-id=386 bgcolor=#fefefe
| 370386 ||  || — || October 4, 2002 || Socorro || LINEAR || ERI || align=right | 1.7 km || 
|-id=387 bgcolor=#fefefe
| 370387 ||  || — || October 4, 2002 || Socorro || LINEAR || — || align=right | 1.0 km || 
|-id=388 bgcolor=#d6d6d6
| 370388 ||  || — || October 4, 2002 || Anderson Mesa || LONEOS || — || align=right | 3.6 km || 
|-id=389 bgcolor=#d6d6d6
| 370389 ||  || — || October 3, 2002 || Campo Imperatore || CINEOS || URS || align=right | 4.5 km || 
|-id=390 bgcolor=#d6d6d6
| 370390 ||  || — || October 4, 2002 || Socorro || LINEAR || — || align=right | 3.9 km || 
|-id=391 bgcolor=#d6d6d6
| 370391 ||  || — || October 5, 2002 || Palomar || NEAT || — || align=right | 4.0 km || 
|-id=392 bgcolor=#d6d6d6
| 370392 ||  || — || October 3, 2002 || Palomar || NEAT || — || align=right | 4.5 km || 
|-id=393 bgcolor=#d6d6d6
| 370393 ||  || — || October 3, 2002 || Palomar || NEAT || — || align=right | 3.2 km || 
|-id=394 bgcolor=#d6d6d6
| 370394 ||  || — || October 3, 2002 || Palomar || NEAT || — || align=right | 4.3 km || 
|-id=395 bgcolor=#d6d6d6
| 370395 ||  || — || October 3, 2002 || Palomar || NEAT || TIR || align=right | 3.1 km || 
|-id=396 bgcolor=#d6d6d6
| 370396 ||  || — || October 3, 2002 || Palomar || NEAT || — || align=right | 4.3 km || 
|-id=397 bgcolor=#d6d6d6
| 370397 ||  || — || October 4, 2002 || Anderson Mesa || LONEOS || — || align=right | 4.9 km || 
|-id=398 bgcolor=#d6d6d6
| 370398 ||  || — || October 4, 2002 || Anderson Mesa || LONEOS || LIX || align=right | 4.2 km || 
|-id=399 bgcolor=#d6d6d6
| 370399 ||  || — || October 13, 2002 || Palomar || NEAT || — || align=right | 5.7 km || 
|-id=400 bgcolor=#d6d6d6
| 370400 ||  || — || October 3, 2002 || Socorro || LINEAR || — || align=right | 2.5 km || 
|}

370401–370500 

|-bgcolor=#d6d6d6
| 370401 ||  || — || October 3, 2002 || Socorro || LINEAR || — || align=right | 2.6 km || 
|-id=402 bgcolor=#d6d6d6
| 370402 ||  || — || October 6, 2002 || Socorro || LINEAR || ALA || align=right | 5.3 km || 
|-id=403 bgcolor=#fefefe
| 370403 ||  || — || October 7, 2002 || Socorro || LINEAR || NYS || align=right data-sort-value="0.82" | 820 m || 
|-id=404 bgcolor=#d6d6d6
| 370404 ||  || — || October 8, 2002 || Socorro || LINEAR || — || align=right | 2.9 km || 
|-id=405 bgcolor=#fefefe
| 370405 ||  || — || October 9, 2002 || Socorro || LINEAR || — || align=right data-sort-value="0.89" | 890 m || 
|-id=406 bgcolor=#fefefe
| 370406 ||  || — || September 5, 2002 || Socorro || LINEAR || — || align=right data-sort-value="0.91" | 910 m || 
|-id=407 bgcolor=#d6d6d6
| 370407 ||  || — || October 4, 2002 || Apache Point || SDSS || VER || align=right | 2.8 km || 
|-id=408 bgcolor=#fefefe
| 370408 ||  || — || October 4, 2002 || Apache Point || SDSS || — || align=right | 1.0 km || 
|-id=409 bgcolor=#d6d6d6
| 370409 ||  || — || October 4, 2002 || Apache Point || SDSS || — || align=right | 3.7 km || 
|-id=410 bgcolor=#d6d6d6
| 370410 ||  || — || October 4, 2002 || Apache Point || SDSS || — || align=right | 3.3 km || 
|-id=411 bgcolor=#d6d6d6
| 370411 ||  || — || October 5, 2002 || Apache Point || SDSS || — || align=right | 2.4 km || 
|-id=412 bgcolor=#d6d6d6
| 370412 ||  || — || October 10, 2002 || Apache Point || SDSS || — || align=right | 2.8 km || 
|-id=413 bgcolor=#d6d6d6
| 370413 ||  || — || October 10, 2002 || Apache Point || SDSS || HYG || align=right | 2.5 km || 
|-id=414 bgcolor=#fefefe
| 370414 ||  || — || October 15, 2002 || Palomar || NEAT || V || align=right data-sort-value="0.80" | 800 m || 
|-id=415 bgcolor=#d6d6d6
| 370415 ||  || — || October 4, 2002 || Palomar || NEAT || — || align=right | 3.1 km || 
|-id=416 bgcolor=#d6d6d6
| 370416 ||  || — || October 5, 2002 || Palomar || NEAT || — || align=right | 3.2 km || 
|-id=417 bgcolor=#d6d6d6
| 370417 ||  || — || October 5, 2002 || Palomar || NEAT || THM || align=right | 2.3 km || 
|-id=418 bgcolor=#fefefe
| 370418 ||  || — || October 6, 2002 || Palomar || NEAT || NYS || align=right data-sort-value="0.51" | 510 m || 
|-id=419 bgcolor=#d6d6d6
| 370419 ||  || — || October 28, 2002 || Palomar || NEAT || THB || align=right | 3.3 km || 
|-id=420 bgcolor=#d6d6d6
| 370420 ||  || — || October 30, 2002 || Socorro || LINEAR || EUP || align=right | 6.1 km || 
|-id=421 bgcolor=#fefefe
| 370421 ||  || — || March 20, 2001 || Kitt Peak || Spacewatch || NYS || align=right data-sort-value="0.95" | 950 m || 
|-id=422 bgcolor=#fefefe
| 370422 ||  || — || October 30, 2002 || Kitt Peak || Spacewatch || NYS || align=right data-sort-value="0.76" | 760 m || 
|-id=423 bgcolor=#d6d6d6
| 370423 ||  || — || October 31, 2002 || Palomar || NEAT || HYG || align=right | 4.0 km || 
|-id=424 bgcolor=#d6d6d6
| 370424 ||  || — || October 31, 2002 || Palomar || NEAT || — || align=right | 3.7 km || 
|-id=425 bgcolor=#fefefe
| 370425 ||  || — || October 29, 2002 || Apache Point || SDSS || — || align=right | 1.1 km || 
|-id=426 bgcolor=#fefefe
| 370426 ||  || — || October 29, 2002 || Palomar || NEAT || V || align=right data-sort-value="0.79" | 790 m || 
|-id=427 bgcolor=#fefefe
| 370427 ||  || — || October 16, 2002 || Palomar || NEAT || NYS || align=right data-sort-value="0.65" | 650 m || 
|-id=428 bgcolor=#fefefe
| 370428 ||  || — || October 30, 2002 || Palomar || NEAT || V || align=right data-sort-value="0.72" | 720 m || 
|-id=429 bgcolor=#fefefe
| 370429 ||  || — || October 29, 2002 || Palomar || NEAT || V || align=right data-sort-value="0.74" | 740 m || 
|-id=430 bgcolor=#d6d6d6
| 370430 ||  || — || November 2, 2002 || Haleakala || NEAT || HYG || align=right | 3.1 km || 
|-id=431 bgcolor=#fefefe
| 370431 ||  || — || November 4, 2002 || Palomar || NEAT || — || align=right | 1.1 km || 
|-id=432 bgcolor=#d6d6d6
| 370432 ||  || — || November 6, 2002 || Anderson Mesa || LONEOS || — || align=right | 4.8 km || 
|-id=433 bgcolor=#d6d6d6
| 370433 ||  || — || November 3, 2002 || Haleakala || NEAT || — || align=right | 3.7 km || 
|-id=434 bgcolor=#d6d6d6
| 370434 ||  || — || November 6, 2002 || Haleakala || NEAT || — || align=right | 5.0 km || 
|-id=435 bgcolor=#d6d6d6
| 370435 ||  || — || November 7, 2002 || Socorro || LINEAR || — || align=right | 4.5 km || 
|-id=436 bgcolor=#fefefe
| 370436 ||  || — || November 8, 2002 || Socorro || LINEAR || H || align=right data-sort-value="0.68" | 680 m || 
|-id=437 bgcolor=#fefefe
| 370437 ||  || — || October 6, 2002 || Socorro || LINEAR || PHO || align=right | 1.2 km || 
|-id=438 bgcolor=#fefefe
| 370438 ||  || — || November 12, 2002 || Socorro || LINEAR || — || align=right | 1.1 km || 
|-id=439 bgcolor=#fefefe
| 370439 ||  || — || November 11, 2002 || Anderson Mesa || LONEOS || — || align=right | 1.2 km || 
|-id=440 bgcolor=#fefefe
| 370440 ||  || — || October 31, 2002 || Anderson Mesa || LONEOS || — || align=right | 1.2 km || 
|-id=441 bgcolor=#fefefe
| 370441 ||  || — || November 13, 2002 || Socorro || LINEAR || CIM || align=right | 2.7 km || 
|-id=442 bgcolor=#d6d6d6
| 370442 ||  || — || November 6, 2002 || Anderson Mesa || LONEOS || — || align=right | 3.4 km || 
|-id=443 bgcolor=#fefefe
| 370443 ||  || — || November 24, 2002 || Palomar || NEAT || — || align=right data-sort-value="0.87" | 870 m || 
|-id=444 bgcolor=#fefefe
| 370444 ||  || — || November 28, 2002 || Anderson Mesa || LONEOS || — || align=right | 1.0 km || 
|-id=445 bgcolor=#fefefe
| 370445 ||  || — || November 16, 2002 || Palomar || NEAT || LCI || align=right | 1.0 km || 
|-id=446 bgcolor=#d6d6d6
| 370446 ||  || — || November 16, 2002 || Palomar || NEAT || THM || align=right | 2.5 km || 
|-id=447 bgcolor=#d6d6d6
| 370447 ||  || — || November 16, 2002 || Palomar || NEAT || — || align=right | 2.9 km || 
|-id=448 bgcolor=#d6d6d6
| 370448 ||  || — || November 16, 2002 || Palomar || NEAT || THM || align=right | 2.6 km || 
|-id=449 bgcolor=#fefefe
| 370449 ||  || — || December 3, 2002 || Haleakala || NEAT || NYS || align=right data-sort-value="0.72" | 720 m || 
|-id=450 bgcolor=#d6d6d6
| 370450 ||  || — || December 3, 2002 || Palomar || NEAT || — || align=right | 4.6 km || 
|-id=451 bgcolor=#fefefe
| 370451 ||  || — || December 3, 2002 || Palomar || NEAT || — || align=right | 1.0 km || 
|-id=452 bgcolor=#d6d6d6
| 370452 ||  || — || December 6, 2002 || Socorro || LINEAR || TIR || align=right | 3.8 km || 
|-id=453 bgcolor=#d6d6d6
| 370453 ||  || — || May 29, 2000 || Kitt Peak || Spacewatch || — || align=right | 4.4 km || 
|-id=454 bgcolor=#E9E9E9
| 370454 ||  || — || December 31, 2002 || Socorro || LINEAR || — || align=right | 1.3 km || 
|-id=455 bgcolor=#fefefe
| 370455 ||  || — || December 27, 2002 || Palomar || NEAT || — || align=right data-sort-value="0.76" | 760 m || 
|-id=456 bgcolor=#E9E9E9
| 370456 ||  || — || January 1, 2003 || Socorro || LINEAR || — || align=right | 1.6 km || 
|-id=457 bgcolor=#fefefe
| 370457 ||  || — || January 5, 2003 || Socorro || LINEAR || NYS || align=right data-sort-value="0.92" | 920 m || 
|-id=458 bgcolor=#E9E9E9
| 370458 ||  || — || January 7, 2003 || Socorro || LINEAR || — || align=right | 1.3 km || 
|-id=459 bgcolor=#E9E9E9
| 370459 ||  || — || January 7, 2003 || Socorro || LINEAR || — || align=right | 1.7 km || 
|-id=460 bgcolor=#E9E9E9
| 370460 ||  || — || January 5, 2003 || Socorro || LINEAR || — || align=right | 1.2 km || 
|-id=461 bgcolor=#E9E9E9
| 370461 ||  || — || January 24, 2003 || Palomar || NEAT || — || align=right | 3.0 km || 
|-id=462 bgcolor=#E9E9E9
| 370462 ||  || — || January 26, 2003 || Palomar || NEAT || — || align=right | 1.8 km || 
|-id=463 bgcolor=#E9E9E9
| 370463 ||  || — || January 27, 2003 || Palomar || NEAT || — || align=right | 1.6 km || 
|-id=464 bgcolor=#E9E9E9
| 370464 ||  || — || January 30, 2003 || Kitt Peak || Spacewatch || — || align=right | 1.0 km || 
|-id=465 bgcolor=#E9E9E9
| 370465 ||  || — || January 29, 2003 || Palomar || NEAT || — || align=right | 1.6 km || 
|-id=466 bgcolor=#E9E9E9
| 370466 ||  || — || February 19, 2003 || Palomar || NEAT || — || align=right | 1.4 km || 
|-id=467 bgcolor=#E9E9E9
| 370467 ||  || — || March 7, 2003 || Socorro || LINEAR || — || align=right | 1.6 km || 
|-id=468 bgcolor=#E9E9E9
| 370468 ||  || — || March 8, 2003 || Kitt Peak || Spacewatch || — || align=right | 1.6 km || 
|-id=469 bgcolor=#E9E9E9
| 370469 ||  || — || March 11, 2003 || Palomar || NEAT || EUN || align=right | 1.3 km || 
|-id=470 bgcolor=#E9E9E9
| 370470 ||  || — || March 24, 2003 || Socorro || LINEAR || BAR || align=right | 1.4 km || 
|-id=471 bgcolor=#E9E9E9
| 370471 ||  || — || March 23, 2003 || Kitt Peak || Spacewatch || — || align=right | 1.5 km || 
|-id=472 bgcolor=#E9E9E9
| 370472 ||  || — || March 23, 2003 || Kitt Peak || Spacewatch || — || align=right | 1.3 km || 
|-id=473 bgcolor=#E9E9E9
| 370473 ||  || — || March 29, 2003 || Anderson Mesa || LONEOS || JUN || align=right | 1.4 km || 
|-id=474 bgcolor=#E9E9E9
| 370474 ||  || — || March 31, 2003 || Anderson Mesa || LONEOS || — || align=right | 1.4 km || 
|-id=475 bgcolor=#E9E9E9
| 370475 ||  || — || March 30, 2003 || Kitt Peak || Spacewatch || — || align=right | 1.5 km || 
|-id=476 bgcolor=#E9E9E9
| 370476 ||  || — || March 23, 2003 || Kitt Peak || Spacewatch || — || align=right | 1.6 km || 
|-id=477 bgcolor=#E9E9E9
| 370477 ||  || — || April 8, 2003 || Palomar || NEAT || MIS || align=right | 2.9 km || 
|-id=478 bgcolor=#E9E9E9
| 370478 ||  || — || April 25, 2003 || Anderson Mesa || LONEOS || — || align=right | 2.5 km || 
|-id=479 bgcolor=#E9E9E9
| 370479 ||  || — || April 27, 2003 || Anderson Mesa || LONEOS || — || align=right | 3.2 km || 
|-id=480 bgcolor=#E9E9E9
| 370480 ||  || — || May 26, 2003 || Kitt Peak || Spacewatch || GEF || align=right | 1.1 km || 
|-id=481 bgcolor=#d6d6d6
| 370481 ||  || — || July 2, 2003 || Socorro || LINEAR || YAK || align=right | 3.2 km || 
|-id=482 bgcolor=#FA8072
| 370482 ||  || — || August 22, 2003 || Campo Imperatore || CINEOS || — || align=right data-sort-value="0.75" | 750 m || 
|-id=483 bgcolor=#d6d6d6
| 370483 ||  || — || August 22, 2003 || Palomar || NEAT || — || align=right | 3.1 km || 
|-id=484 bgcolor=#fefefe
| 370484 ||  || — || August 22, 2003 || Socorro || LINEAR || FLO || align=right data-sort-value="0.71" | 710 m || 
|-id=485 bgcolor=#fefefe
| 370485 ||  || — || August 24, 2003 || Socorro || LINEAR || — || align=right data-sort-value="0.82" | 820 m || 
|-id=486 bgcolor=#fefefe
| 370486 ||  || — || August 24, 2003 || Socorro || LINEAR || — || align=right data-sort-value="0.96" | 960 m || 
|-id=487 bgcolor=#d6d6d6
| 370487 ||  || — || August 30, 2003 || Kitt Peak || Spacewatch || KOR || align=right | 1.4 km || 
|-id=488 bgcolor=#fefefe
| 370488 ||  || — || September 15, 2003 || Palomar || NEAT || — || align=right data-sort-value="0.79" | 790 m || 
|-id=489 bgcolor=#d6d6d6
| 370489 ||  || — || September 15, 2003 || Anderson Mesa || LONEOS || — || align=right | 3.0 km || 
|-id=490 bgcolor=#fefefe
| 370490 ||  || — || September 15, 2003 || Anderson Mesa || LONEOS || FLO || align=right data-sort-value="0.67" | 670 m || 
|-id=491 bgcolor=#FA8072
| 370491 ||  || — || September 16, 2003 || Kitt Peak || Spacewatch || — || align=right data-sort-value="0.87" | 870 m || 
|-id=492 bgcolor=#d6d6d6
| 370492 ||  || — || September 16, 2003 || Kitt Peak || Spacewatch || — || align=right | 2.9 km || 
|-id=493 bgcolor=#d6d6d6
| 370493 ||  || — || September 17, 2003 || Kitt Peak || Spacewatch || — || align=right | 3.3 km || 
|-id=494 bgcolor=#d6d6d6
| 370494 ||  || — || September 17, 2003 || Haleakala || NEAT || YAK || align=right | 3.5 km || 
|-id=495 bgcolor=#fefefe
| 370495 ||  || — || September 18, 2003 || Palomar || NEAT || FLO || align=right data-sort-value="0.79" | 790 m || 
|-id=496 bgcolor=#d6d6d6
| 370496 ||  || — || September 18, 2003 || Palomar || NEAT || EOS || align=right | 2.6 km || 
|-id=497 bgcolor=#d6d6d6
| 370497 ||  || — || September 18, 2003 || Kitt Peak || Spacewatch || — || align=right | 2.4 km || 
|-id=498 bgcolor=#d6d6d6
| 370498 ||  || — || September 18, 2003 || Socorro || LINEAR || PAL || align=right | 2.7 km || 
|-id=499 bgcolor=#fefefe
| 370499 ||  || — || September 16, 2003 || Anderson Mesa || LONEOS || — || align=right data-sort-value="0.88" | 880 m || 
|-id=500 bgcolor=#fefefe
| 370500 ||  || — || September 17, 2003 || Socorro || LINEAR || — || align=right data-sort-value="0.79" | 790 m || 
|}

370501–370600 

|-bgcolor=#d6d6d6
| 370501 ||  || — || September 18, 2003 || Kitt Peak || Spacewatch || BRA || align=right | 2.1 km || 
|-id=502 bgcolor=#d6d6d6
| 370502 ||  || — || September 18, 2003 || Kitt Peak || Spacewatch || — || align=right | 2.3 km || 
|-id=503 bgcolor=#fefefe
| 370503 ||  || — || September 18, 2003 || Kitt Peak || Spacewatch || — || align=right data-sort-value="0.71" | 710 m || 
|-id=504 bgcolor=#fefefe
| 370504 ||  || — || September 18, 2003 || Campo Imperatore || CINEOS || — || align=right data-sort-value="0.92" | 920 m || 
|-id=505 bgcolor=#fefefe
| 370505 ||  || — || September 18, 2003 || Kitt Peak || Spacewatch || FLO || align=right data-sort-value="0.67" | 670 m || 
|-id=506 bgcolor=#fefefe
| 370506 ||  || — || September 20, 2003 || Palomar || NEAT || — || align=right data-sort-value="0.87" | 870 m || 
|-id=507 bgcolor=#fefefe
| 370507 ||  || — || September 20, 2003 || Kitt Peak || Spacewatch || V || align=right data-sort-value="0.68" | 680 m || 
|-id=508 bgcolor=#d6d6d6
| 370508 ||  || — || September 19, 2003 || Socorro || LINEAR || — || align=right | 4.2 km || 
|-id=509 bgcolor=#fefefe
| 370509 ||  || — || September 17, 2003 || Kitt Peak || Spacewatch || — || align=right data-sort-value="0.60" | 600 m || 
|-id=510 bgcolor=#FA8072
| 370510 ||  || — || September 19, 2003 || Kitt Peak || Spacewatch || H || align=right data-sort-value="0.82" | 820 m || 
|-id=511 bgcolor=#fefefe
| 370511 ||  || — || September 22, 2003 || Anderson Mesa || LONEOS || FLO || align=right data-sort-value="0.71" | 710 m || 
|-id=512 bgcolor=#d6d6d6
| 370512 ||  || — || September 20, 2003 || Socorro || LINEAR || — || align=right | 2.8 km || 
|-id=513 bgcolor=#fefefe
| 370513 ||  || — || September 20, 2003 || Socorro || LINEAR || — || align=right data-sort-value="0.68" | 680 m || 
|-id=514 bgcolor=#fefefe
| 370514 ||  || — || September 3, 2003 || Socorro || LINEAR || FLO || align=right data-sort-value="0.58" | 580 m || 
|-id=515 bgcolor=#fefefe
| 370515 ||  || — || September 27, 2003 || Desert Eagle || W. K. Y. Yeung || FLO || align=right data-sort-value="0.62" | 620 m || 
|-id=516 bgcolor=#d6d6d6
| 370516 ||  || — || September 26, 2003 || Socorro || LINEAR || — || align=right | 2.7 km || 
|-id=517 bgcolor=#fefefe
| 370517 ||  || — || September 27, 2003 || Kitt Peak || Spacewatch || — || align=right data-sort-value="0.59" | 590 m || 
|-id=518 bgcolor=#d6d6d6
| 370518 ||  || — || September 27, 2003 || Socorro || LINEAR || — || align=right | 2.4 km || 
|-id=519 bgcolor=#fefefe
| 370519 ||  || — || September 28, 2003 || Socorro || LINEAR || — || align=right data-sort-value="0.80" | 800 m || 
|-id=520 bgcolor=#d6d6d6
| 370520 ||  || — || September 27, 2003 || Socorro || LINEAR || EOS || align=right | 2.2 km || 
|-id=521 bgcolor=#d6d6d6
| 370521 ||  || — || September 19, 2003 || Kitt Peak || Spacewatch || — || align=right | 4.3 km || 
|-id=522 bgcolor=#d6d6d6
| 370522 ||  || — || September 20, 2003 || Socorro || LINEAR || — || align=right | 3.4 km || 
|-id=523 bgcolor=#d6d6d6
| 370523 ||  || — || September 29, 2003 || Anderson Mesa || LONEOS || BRA || align=right | 1.6 km || 
|-id=524 bgcolor=#d6d6d6
| 370524 ||  || — || September 29, 2003 || Anderson Mesa || LONEOS || — || align=right | 2.9 km || 
|-id=525 bgcolor=#d6d6d6
| 370525 ||  || — || September 30, 2003 || Socorro || LINEAR || — || align=right | 4.2 km || 
|-id=526 bgcolor=#d6d6d6
| 370526 ||  || — || September 30, 2003 || Socorro || LINEAR || — || align=right | 4.3 km || 
|-id=527 bgcolor=#fefefe
| 370527 ||  || — || September 16, 2003 || Kitt Peak || Spacewatch || — || align=right data-sort-value="0.65" | 650 m || 
|-id=528 bgcolor=#fefefe
| 370528 ||  || — || September 17, 2003 || Palomar || NEAT || — || align=right data-sort-value="0.84" | 840 m || 
|-id=529 bgcolor=#d6d6d6
| 370529 ||  || — || September 20, 2003 || Palomar || NEAT || — || align=right | 3.3 km || 
|-id=530 bgcolor=#d6d6d6
| 370530 ||  || — || September 20, 2003 || Kitt Peak || Spacewatch || — || align=right | 3.4 km || 
|-id=531 bgcolor=#d6d6d6
| 370531 ||  || — || September 18, 2003 || Kitt Peak || Spacewatch || — || align=right | 2.2 km || 
|-id=532 bgcolor=#fefefe
| 370532 ||  || — || September 26, 2003 || Apache Point || SDSS || FLO || align=right data-sort-value="0.64" | 640 m || 
|-id=533 bgcolor=#d6d6d6
| 370533 ||  || — || September 26, 2003 || Apache Point || SDSS || — || align=right | 1.9 km || 
|-id=534 bgcolor=#d6d6d6
| 370534 ||  || — || September 26, 2003 || Apache Point || SDSS || — || align=right | 3.4 km || 
|-id=535 bgcolor=#fefefe
| 370535 ||  || — || September 26, 2003 || Apache Point || SDSS || FLO || align=right data-sort-value="0.48" | 480 m || 
|-id=536 bgcolor=#d6d6d6
| 370536 ||  || — || September 26, 2003 || Apache Point || SDSS || — || align=right | 2.6 km || 
|-id=537 bgcolor=#d6d6d6
| 370537 ||  || — || January 16, 2000 || Kitt Peak || Spacewatch || — || align=right | 3.5 km || 
|-id=538 bgcolor=#fefefe
| 370538 ||  || — || September 28, 2003 || Apache Point || SDSS || FLO || align=right data-sort-value="0.59" | 590 m || 
|-id=539 bgcolor=#fefefe
| 370539 ||  || — || September 26, 2003 || Apache Point || SDSS || V || align=right data-sort-value="0.57" | 570 m || 
|-id=540 bgcolor=#d6d6d6
| 370540 ||  || — || September 20, 2003 || Kitt Peak || Spacewatch || — || align=right | 4.2 km || 
|-id=541 bgcolor=#d6d6d6
| 370541 ||  || — || September 30, 2003 || Kitt Peak || Spacewatch || — || align=right | 2.1 km || 
|-id=542 bgcolor=#d6d6d6
| 370542 ||  || — || September 18, 2003 || Kitt Peak || Spacewatch || EOS || align=right | 1.5 km || 
|-id=543 bgcolor=#d6d6d6
| 370543 ||  || — || October 3, 2003 || Kitt Peak || Spacewatch || — || align=right | 3.9 km || 
|-id=544 bgcolor=#fefefe
| 370544 ||  || — || October 15, 2003 || Anderson Mesa || LONEOS || — || align=right data-sort-value="0.82" | 820 m || 
|-id=545 bgcolor=#fefefe
| 370545 ||  || — || September 19, 2003 || Anderson Mesa || LONEOS || V || align=right data-sort-value="0.73" | 730 m || 
|-id=546 bgcolor=#fefefe
| 370546 ||  || — || October 15, 2003 || Anderson Mesa || LONEOS || FLO || align=right data-sort-value="0.60" | 600 m || 
|-id=547 bgcolor=#d6d6d6
| 370547 ||  || — || October 15, 2003 || Anderson Mesa || LONEOS || — || align=right | 4.9 km || 
|-id=548 bgcolor=#fefefe
| 370548 ||  || — || October 1, 2003 || Kitt Peak || Spacewatch || — || align=right data-sort-value="0.78" | 780 m || 
|-id=549 bgcolor=#d6d6d6
| 370549 ||  || — || October 1, 2003 || Kitt Peak || Spacewatch || — || align=right | 3.5 km || 
|-id=550 bgcolor=#fefefe
| 370550 ||  || — || October 19, 2003 || Kitt Peak || Spacewatch || FLO || align=right data-sort-value="0.64" | 640 m || 
|-id=551 bgcolor=#fefefe
| 370551 ||  || — || October 16, 2003 || Anderson Mesa || LONEOS || FLO || align=right data-sort-value="0.86" | 860 m || 
|-id=552 bgcolor=#d6d6d6
| 370552 ||  || — || October 20, 2003 || Kitt Peak || Spacewatch || — || align=right | 2.4 km || 
|-id=553 bgcolor=#fefefe
| 370553 ||  || — || October 23, 2003 || Junk Bond || Junk Bond Obs. || FLO || align=right data-sort-value="0.81" | 810 m || 
|-id=554 bgcolor=#d6d6d6
| 370554 ||  || — || October 17, 2003 || Anderson Mesa || LONEOS || — || align=right | 3.9 km || 
|-id=555 bgcolor=#d6d6d6
| 370555 ||  || — || October 16, 2003 || Kitt Peak || Spacewatch || — || align=right | 3.0 km || 
|-id=556 bgcolor=#d6d6d6
| 370556 ||  || — || October 18, 2003 || Kitt Peak || Spacewatch || KOR || align=right | 1.3 km || 
|-id=557 bgcolor=#d6d6d6
| 370557 ||  || — || October 16, 2003 || Anderson Mesa || LONEOS || — || align=right | 3.5 km || 
|-id=558 bgcolor=#fefefe
| 370558 ||  || — || October 20, 2003 || Palomar || NEAT || — || align=right data-sort-value="0.78" | 780 m || 
|-id=559 bgcolor=#d6d6d6
| 370559 ||  || — || October 18, 2003 || Kitt Peak || Spacewatch || — || align=right | 2.9 km || 
|-id=560 bgcolor=#fefefe
| 370560 ||  || — || October 21, 2003 || Socorro || LINEAR || — || align=right data-sort-value="0.75" | 750 m || 
|-id=561 bgcolor=#d6d6d6
| 370561 ||  || — || October 21, 2003 || Kitt Peak || Spacewatch || EOS || align=right | 2.4 km || 
|-id=562 bgcolor=#d6d6d6
| 370562 ||  || — || October 22, 2003 || Socorro || LINEAR || — || align=right | 2.8 km || 
|-id=563 bgcolor=#d6d6d6
| 370563 ||  || — || October 21, 2003 || Anderson Mesa || LONEOS || — || align=right | 2.7 km || 
|-id=564 bgcolor=#fefefe
| 370564 ||  || — || October 21, 2003 || Socorro || LINEAR || — || align=right data-sort-value="0.78" | 780 m || 
|-id=565 bgcolor=#fefefe
| 370565 ||  || — || October 22, 2003 || Socorro || LINEAR || — || align=right data-sort-value="0.98" | 980 m || 
|-id=566 bgcolor=#fefefe
| 370566 ||  || — || October 22, 2003 || Socorro || LINEAR || — || align=right data-sort-value="0.90" | 900 m || 
|-id=567 bgcolor=#d6d6d6
| 370567 ||  || — || October 22, 2003 || Socorro || LINEAR || — || align=right | 2.8 km || 
|-id=568 bgcolor=#fefefe
| 370568 ||  || — || October 23, 2003 || Anderson Mesa || LONEOS || — || align=right | 1.0 km || 
|-id=569 bgcolor=#d6d6d6
| 370569 ||  || — || October 20, 2003 || Kitt Peak || Spacewatch || — || align=right | 2.6 km || 
|-id=570 bgcolor=#d6d6d6
| 370570 ||  || — || October 21, 2003 || Socorro || LINEAR || — || align=right | 2.4 km || 
|-id=571 bgcolor=#fefefe
| 370571 ||  || — || October 23, 2003 || Haleakala || NEAT || — || align=right data-sort-value="0.99" | 990 m || 
|-id=572 bgcolor=#fefefe
| 370572 ||  || — || October 21, 2003 || Anderson Mesa || LONEOS || — || align=right data-sort-value="0.81" | 810 m || 
|-id=573 bgcolor=#d6d6d6
| 370573 ||  || — || October 22, 2003 || Kitt Peak || Spacewatch || — || align=right | 3.9 km || 
|-id=574 bgcolor=#fefefe
| 370574 ||  || — || October 24, 2003 || Socorro || LINEAR || — || align=right data-sort-value="0.79" | 790 m || 
|-id=575 bgcolor=#d6d6d6
| 370575 ||  || — || October 24, 2003 || Kitt Peak || Spacewatch || — || align=right | 5.0 km || 
|-id=576 bgcolor=#d6d6d6
| 370576 ||  || — || October 29, 2003 || Socorro || LINEAR || — || align=right | 3.9 km || 
|-id=577 bgcolor=#FA8072
| 370577 ||  || — || October 22, 2003 || Anderson Mesa || LONEOS || — || align=right | 1.4 km || 
|-id=578 bgcolor=#d6d6d6
| 370578 ||  || — || October 16, 2003 || Kitt Peak || Spacewatch || — || align=right | 2.8 km || 
|-id=579 bgcolor=#d6d6d6
| 370579 ||  || — || October 18, 2003 || Kitt Peak || Spacewatch || — || align=right | 3.0 km || 
|-id=580 bgcolor=#d6d6d6
| 370580 ||  || — || October 19, 2003 || Kitt Peak || Spacewatch || — || align=right | 3.2 km || 
|-id=581 bgcolor=#d6d6d6
| 370581 ||  || — || October 19, 2003 || Apache Point || SDSS || — || align=right | 2.3 km || 
|-id=582 bgcolor=#d6d6d6
| 370582 ||  || — || October 18, 2003 || Apache Point || SDSS || — || align=right | 2.6 km || 
|-id=583 bgcolor=#d6d6d6
| 370583 ||  || — || September 21, 2003 || Kitt Peak || Spacewatch || — || align=right | 2.2 km || 
|-id=584 bgcolor=#d6d6d6
| 370584 ||  || — || October 20, 2003 || Kitt Peak || Spacewatch || — || align=right | 3.0 km || 
|-id=585 bgcolor=#d6d6d6
| 370585 ||  || — || October 22, 2003 || Apache Point || SDSS || KOR || align=right | 1.4 km || 
|-id=586 bgcolor=#d6d6d6
| 370586 ||  || — || November 16, 2003 || Kitt Peak || Spacewatch || — || align=right | 2.0 km || 
|-id=587 bgcolor=#d6d6d6
| 370587 ||  || — || November 19, 2003 || Socorro || LINEAR || — || align=right | 2.9 km || 
|-id=588 bgcolor=#d6d6d6
| 370588 ||  || — || November 18, 2003 || Kitt Peak || Spacewatch || EOS || align=right | 2.0 km || 
|-id=589 bgcolor=#d6d6d6
| 370589 ||  || — || November 18, 2003 || Kitt Peak || Spacewatch || EOS || align=right | 2.3 km || 
|-id=590 bgcolor=#fefefe
| 370590 ||  || — || November 18, 2003 || Palomar || NEAT || FLO || align=right data-sort-value="0.77" | 770 m || 
|-id=591 bgcolor=#d6d6d6
| 370591 ||  || — || November 19, 2003 || Kitt Peak || Spacewatch || — || align=right | 3.0 km || 
|-id=592 bgcolor=#d6d6d6
| 370592 ||  || — || November 19, 2003 || Socorro || LINEAR || EOS || align=right | 2.6 km || 
|-id=593 bgcolor=#d6d6d6
| 370593 ||  || — || November 19, 2003 || Socorro || LINEAR || — || align=right | 3.0 km || 
|-id=594 bgcolor=#fefefe
| 370594 ||  || — || November 19, 2003 || Socorro || LINEAR || FLO || align=right data-sort-value="0.65" | 650 m || 
|-id=595 bgcolor=#d6d6d6
| 370595 ||  || — || November 20, 2003 || Socorro || LINEAR || EOS || align=right | 2.7 km || 
|-id=596 bgcolor=#d6d6d6
| 370596 ||  || — || November 19, 2003 || Kitt Peak || Spacewatch || — || align=right | 4.2 km || 
|-id=597 bgcolor=#d6d6d6
| 370597 ||  || — || November 19, 2003 || Kitt Peak || Spacewatch || — || align=right | 2.6 km || 
|-id=598 bgcolor=#fefefe
| 370598 ||  || — || November 20, 2003 || Kitt Peak || Spacewatch || — || align=right data-sort-value="0.97" | 970 m || 
|-id=599 bgcolor=#fefefe
| 370599 ||  || — || November 19, 2003 || Anderson Mesa || LONEOS || — || align=right data-sort-value="0.88" | 880 m || 
|-id=600 bgcolor=#fefefe
| 370600 ||  || — || November 20, 2003 || Socorro || LINEAR || — || align=right data-sort-value="0.97" | 970 m || 
|}

370601–370700 

|-bgcolor=#fefefe
| 370601 ||  || — || November 20, 2003 || Socorro || LINEAR || FLO || align=right data-sort-value="0.72" | 720 m || 
|-id=602 bgcolor=#fefefe
| 370602 ||  || — || November 19, 2003 || Kitt Peak || Spacewatch || — || align=right data-sort-value="0.67" | 670 m || 
|-id=603 bgcolor=#d6d6d6
| 370603 ||  || — || November 21, 2003 || Socorro || LINEAR || ALA || align=right | 6.5 km || 
|-id=604 bgcolor=#d6d6d6
| 370604 ||  || — || November 26, 2003 || Kitt Peak || Spacewatch || EOS || align=right | 2.5 km || 
|-id=605 bgcolor=#d6d6d6
| 370605 ||  || — || November 30, 2003 || Kitt Peak || Spacewatch || — || align=right | 2.4 km || 
|-id=606 bgcolor=#d6d6d6
| 370606 ||  || — || November 30, 2003 || Socorro || LINEAR || — || align=right | 3.6 km || 
|-id=607 bgcolor=#d6d6d6
| 370607 ||  || — || November 30, 2003 || Kitt Peak || Spacewatch || HYG || align=right | 3.1 km || 
|-id=608 bgcolor=#fefefe
| 370608 ||  || — || November 22, 2003 || Kitt Peak || M. W. Buie || — || align=right data-sort-value="0.54" | 540 m || 
|-id=609 bgcolor=#d6d6d6
| 370609 ||  || — || November 19, 2003 || Palomar || NEAT || — || align=right | 3.5 km || 
|-id=610 bgcolor=#d6d6d6
| 370610 ||  || — || December 14, 2003 || Palomar || NEAT || — || align=right | 3.9 km || 
|-id=611 bgcolor=#fefefe
| 370611 ||  || — || December 14, 2003 || Kitt Peak || Spacewatch || — || align=right data-sort-value="0.77" | 770 m || 
|-id=612 bgcolor=#fefefe
| 370612 ||  || — || December 18, 2003 || Socorro || LINEAR || H || align=right data-sort-value="0.91" | 910 m || 
|-id=613 bgcolor=#d6d6d6
| 370613 ||  || — || December 16, 2003 || Socorro || LINEAR || — || align=right | 6.0 km || 
|-id=614 bgcolor=#d6d6d6
| 370614 ||  || — || December 16, 2003 || Anderson Mesa || LONEOS || — || align=right | 4.3 km || 
|-id=615 bgcolor=#d6d6d6
| 370615 ||  || — || December 17, 2003 || Socorro || LINEAR || — || align=right | 4.0 km || 
|-id=616 bgcolor=#d6d6d6
| 370616 ||  || — || December 17, 2003 || Kitt Peak || Spacewatch || — || align=right | 4.5 km || 
|-id=617 bgcolor=#d6d6d6
| 370617 ||  || — || November 26, 2003 || Kitt Peak || Spacewatch || — || align=right | 3.0 km || 
|-id=618 bgcolor=#d6d6d6
| 370618 ||  || — || December 17, 2003 || Kitt Peak || Spacewatch || HYG || align=right | 4.1 km || 
|-id=619 bgcolor=#d6d6d6
| 370619 ||  || — || December 18, 2003 || Kitt Peak || Spacewatch || — || align=right | 2.8 km || 
|-id=620 bgcolor=#fefefe
| 370620 ||  || — || December 17, 2003 || Kitt Peak || Spacewatch || NYS || align=right data-sort-value="0.67" | 670 m || 
|-id=621 bgcolor=#d6d6d6
| 370621 ||  || — || December 17, 2003 || Palomar || NEAT || — || align=right | 2.7 km || 
|-id=622 bgcolor=#fefefe
| 370622 ||  || — || December 19, 2003 || Kitt Peak || Spacewatch || — || align=right | 1.0 km || 
|-id=623 bgcolor=#fefefe
| 370623 ||  || — || December 18, 2003 || Socorro || LINEAR || — || align=right data-sort-value="0.94" | 940 m || 
|-id=624 bgcolor=#d6d6d6
| 370624 ||  || — || December 18, 2003 || Haleakala || NEAT || THB || align=right | 4.7 km || 
|-id=625 bgcolor=#fefefe
| 370625 ||  || — || December 19, 2003 || Socorro || LINEAR || — || align=right data-sort-value="0.87" | 870 m || 
|-id=626 bgcolor=#d6d6d6
| 370626 ||  || — || December 19, 2003 || Socorro || LINEAR || — || align=right | 4.9 km || 
|-id=627 bgcolor=#d6d6d6
| 370627 ||  || — || December 19, 2003 || Socorro || LINEAR || — || align=right | 4.3 km || 
|-id=628 bgcolor=#d6d6d6
| 370628 ||  || — || December 18, 2003 || Socorro || LINEAR || — || align=right | 2.6 km || 
|-id=629 bgcolor=#fefefe
| 370629 ||  || — || December 23, 2003 || Socorro || LINEAR || — || align=right | 1.2 km || 
|-id=630 bgcolor=#fefefe
| 370630 ||  || — || December 27, 2003 || Socorro || LINEAR || H || align=right data-sort-value="0.71" | 710 m || 
|-id=631 bgcolor=#fefefe
| 370631 ||  || — || November 24, 2003 || Socorro || LINEAR || H || align=right data-sort-value="0.70" | 700 m || 
|-id=632 bgcolor=#fefefe
| 370632 ||  || — || December 27, 2003 || Socorro || LINEAR || ERI || align=right | 1.5 km || 
|-id=633 bgcolor=#FA8072
| 370633 ||  || — || December 27, 2003 || Socorro || LINEAR || — || align=right data-sort-value="0.73" | 730 m || 
|-id=634 bgcolor=#d6d6d6
| 370634 ||  || — || December 27, 2003 || Socorro || LINEAR || LIX || align=right | 4.7 km || 
|-id=635 bgcolor=#d6d6d6
| 370635 ||  || — || December 28, 2003 || Kitt Peak || Spacewatch || HYG || align=right | 3.1 km || 
|-id=636 bgcolor=#d6d6d6
| 370636 ||  || — || December 19, 2003 || Catalina || CSS || — || align=right | 3.7 km || 
|-id=637 bgcolor=#fefefe
| 370637 ||  || — || December 17, 2003 || Kitt Peak || Spacewatch || FLO || align=right data-sort-value="0.62" | 620 m || 
|-id=638 bgcolor=#d6d6d6
| 370638 ||  || — || December 17, 2003 || Kitt Peak || Spacewatch || — || align=right | 4.0 km || 
|-id=639 bgcolor=#fefefe
| 370639 ||  || — || December 19, 2003 || Socorro || LINEAR || — || align=right data-sort-value="0.89" | 890 m || 
|-id=640 bgcolor=#d6d6d6
| 370640 ||  || — || November 24, 2003 || Kitt Peak || Spacewatch || — || align=right | 3.9 km || 
|-id=641 bgcolor=#fefefe
| 370641 ||  || — || January 15, 2004 || Kitt Peak || Spacewatch || — || align=right data-sort-value="0.81" | 810 m || 
|-id=642 bgcolor=#fefefe
| 370642 ||  || — || January 18, 2004 || Catalina || CSS || — || align=right | 1.2 km || 
|-id=643 bgcolor=#fefefe
| 370643 ||  || — || January 16, 2004 || Kitt Peak || Spacewatch || — || align=right data-sort-value="0.74" | 740 m || 
|-id=644 bgcolor=#d6d6d6
| 370644 ||  || — || January 18, 2004 || Palomar || NEAT || — || align=right | 2.9 km || 
|-id=645 bgcolor=#d6d6d6
| 370645 ||  || — || January 21, 2004 || Socorro || LINEAR || — || align=right | 2.8 km || 
|-id=646 bgcolor=#fefefe
| 370646 ||  || — || January 21, 2004 || Socorro || LINEAR || ERI || align=right | 1.6 km || 
|-id=647 bgcolor=#d6d6d6
| 370647 ||  || — || January 22, 2004 || Socorro || LINEAR || — || align=right | 2.4 km || 
|-id=648 bgcolor=#FA8072
| 370648 ||  || — || January 27, 2004 || Socorro || LINEAR || H || align=right data-sort-value="0.86" | 860 m || 
|-id=649 bgcolor=#d6d6d6
| 370649 ||  || — || January 22, 2004 || Socorro || LINEAR || HYG || align=right | 3.4 km || 
|-id=650 bgcolor=#fefefe
| 370650 ||  || — || January 22, 2004 || Socorro || LINEAR || — || align=right data-sort-value="0.83" | 830 m || 
|-id=651 bgcolor=#FA8072
| 370651 ||  || — || January 29, 2004 || Socorro || LINEAR || — || align=right | 1.6 km || 
|-id=652 bgcolor=#fefefe
| 370652 ||  || — || January 24, 2004 || Socorro || LINEAR || NYS || align=right data-sort-value="0.63" | 630 m || 
|-id=653 bgcolor=#fefefe
| 370653 ||  || — || January 19, 2004 || Kitt Peak || Spacewatch || — || align=right data-sort-value="0.94" | 940 m || 
|-id=654 bgcolor=#d6d6d6
| 370654 ||  || — || January 16, 2004 || Kitt Peak || Spacewatch || — || align=right | 4.7 km || 
|-id=655 bgcolor=#fefefe
| 370655 ||  || — || February 10, 2004 || Nogales || Tenagra II Obs. || NYS || align=right data-sort-value="0.63" | 630 m || 
|-id=656 bgcolor=#fefefe
| 370656 ||  || — || February 12, 2004 || Kitt Peak || Spacewatch || NYS || align=right data-sort-value="0.81" | 810 m || 
|-id=657 bgcolor=#fefefe
| 370657 ||  || — || February 13, 2004 || Desert Eagle || W. K. Y. Yeung || — || align=right | 1.2 km || 
|-id=658 bgcolor=#d6d6d6
| 370658 ||  || — || February 11, 2004 || Palomar || NEAT || EUP || align=right | 4.0 km || 
|-id=659 bgcolor=#fefefe
| 370659 ||  || — || February 13, 2004 || Palomar || NEAT || H || align=right data-sort-value="0.72" | 720 m || 
|-id=660 bgcolor=#fefefe
| 370660 ||  || — || February 12, 2004 || Palomar || NEAT || H || align=right data-sort-value="0.75" | 750 m || 
|-id=661 bgcolor=#fefefe
| 370661 ||  || — || February 11, 2004 || Kitt Peak || Spacewatch || — || align=right data-sort-value="0.97" | 970 m || 
|-id=662 bgcolor=#d6d6d6
| 370662 ||  || — || February 11, 2004 || Palomar || NEAT || EUP || align=right | 6.3 km || 
|-id=663 bgcolor=#fefefe
| 370663 ||  || — || February 12, 2004 || Kitt Peak || Spacewatch || — || align=right | 1.1 km || 
|-id=664 bgcolor=#d6d6d6
| 370664 ||  || — || February 13, 2004 || Palomar || NEAT || LIX || align=right | 4.5 km || 
|-id=665 bgcolor=#d6d6d6
| 370665 ||  || — || February 12, 2004 || Palomar || NEAT || — || align=right | 2.5 km || 
|-id=666 bgcolor=#d6d6d6
| 370666 ||  || — || February 15, 2004 || Socorro || LINEAR || TIR || align=right | 3.4 km || 
|-id=667 bgcolor=#d6d6d6
| 370667 ||  || — || February 13, 2004 || Anderson Mesa || LONEOS || ALA || align=right | 4.9 km || 
|-id=668 bgcolor=#d6d6d6
| 370668 ||  || — || February 13, 2004 || Palomar || NEAT || TIR || align=right | 2.8 km || 
|-id=669 bgcolor=#d6d6d6
| 370669 ||  || — || February 16, 2004 || Socorro || LINEAR || — || align=right | 3.3 km || 
|-id=670 bgcolor=#fefefe
| 370670 ||  || — || February 19, 2004 || Socorro || LINEAR || H || align=right data-sort-value="0.82" | 820 m || 
|-id=671 bgcolor=#fefefe
| 370671 ||  || — || February 19, 2004 || Socorro || LINEAR || — || align=right | 1.1 km || 
|-id=672 bgcolor=#fefefe
| 370672 ||  || — || February 19, 2004 || Socorro || LINEAR || — || align=right | 1.3 km || 
|-id=673 bgcolor=#fefefe
| 370673 ||  || — || February 19, 2004 || Haleakala || NEAT || NYS || align=right data-sort-value="0.82" | 820 m || 
|-id=674 bgcolor=#fefefe
| 370674 ||  || — || March 12, 2004 || Palomar || NEAT || NYS || align=right data-sort-value="0.75" | 750 m || 
|-id=675 bgcolor=#fefefe
| 370675 ||  || — || March 15, 2004 || Kitt Peak || Spacewatch || V || align=right data-sort-value="0.68" | 680 m || 
|-id=676 bgcolor=#d6d6d6
| 370676 ||  || — || March 15, 2004 || Palomar || NEAT || — || align=right | 4.8 km || 
|-id=677 bgcolor=#fefefe
| 370677 ||  || — || March 12, 2004 || Palomar || NEAT || — || align=right data-sort-value="0.87" | 870 m || 
|-id=678 bgcolor=#fefefe
| 370678 ||  || — || March 14, 2004 || Socorro || LINEAR || H || align=right data-sort-value="0.75" | 750 m || 
|-id=679 bgcolor=#d6d6d6
| 370679 ||  || — || March 15, 2004 || Socorro || LINEAR || 7:4 || align=right | 6.5 km || 
|-id=680 bgcolor=#fefefe
| 370680 ||  || — || March 15, 2004 || Socorro || LINEAR || NYS || align=right data-sort-value="0.76" | 760 m || 
|-id=681 bgcolor=#fefefe
| 370681 ||  || — || March 15, 2004 || Catalina || CSS || NYS || align=right data-sort-value="0.98" | 980 m || 
|-id=682 bgcolor=#fefefe
| 370682 ||  || — || March 15, 2004 || Kitt Peak || Spacewatch || — || align=right data-sort-value="0.90" | 900 m || 
|-id=683 bgcolor=#fefefe
| 370683 ||  || — || March 16, 2004 || Campo Imperatore || CINEOS || H || align=right data-sort-value="0.62" | 620 m || 
|-id=684 bgcolor=#fefefe
| 370684 ||  || — || March 17, 2004 || Socorro || LINEAR || H || align=right data-sort-value="0.72" | 720 m || 
|-id=685 bgcolor=#fefefe
| 370685 ||  || — || March 16, 2004 || Kitt Peak || Spacewatch || V || align=right data-sort-value="0.62" | 620 m || 
|-id=686 bgcolor=#fefefe
| 370686 ||  || — || March 26, 2004 || Kitt Peak || DLS || NYS || align=right data-sort-value="0.82" | 820 m || 
|-id=687 bgcolor=#E9E9E9
| 370687 ||  || — || April 14, 2004 || Anderson Mesa || LONEOS || EUN || align=right | 1.8 km || 
|-id=688 bgcolor=#FFC2E0
| 370688 ||  || — || April 13, 2004 || Palomar || NEAT || AMO +1km || align=right | 1.2 km || 
|-id=689 bgcolor=#fefefe
| 370689 ||  || — || April 12, 2004 || Kitt Peak || Spacewatch || MAS || align=right data-sort-value="0.90" | 900 m || 
|-id=690 bgcolor=#fefefe
| 370690 ||  || — || April 14, 2004 || Kitt Peak || Spacewatch || — || align=right data-sort-value="0.89" | 890 m || 
|-id=691 bgcolor=#d6d6d6
| 370691 ||  || — || April 13, 2004 || Kitt Peak || Spacewatch || 7:4 || align=right | 4.3 km || 
|-id=692 bgcolor=#fefefe
| 370692 ||  || — || April 21, 2004 || Socorro || LINEAR || V || align=right data-sort-value="0.81" | 810 m || 
|-id=693 bgcolor=#fefefe
| 370693 ||  || — || April 22, 2004 || Goodricke-Pigott || R. A. Tucker || — || align=right | 1.1 km || 
|-id=694 bgcolor=#E9E9E9
| 370694 ||  || — || April 24, 2004 || Haleakala || NEAT || — || align=right | 1.9 km || 
|-id=695 bgcolor=#E9E9E9
| 370695 ||  || — || April 24, 2004 || Kitt Peak || Spacewatch || — || align=right | 1.3 km || 
|-id=696 bgcolor=#E9E9E9
| 370696 ||  || — || May 9, 2004 || Palomar || NEAT || — || align=right | 1.3 km || 
|-id=697 bgcolor=#E9E9E9
| 370697 ||  || — || May 9, 2004 || Haleakala || NEAT || — || align=right | 1.6 km || 
|-id=698 bgcolor=#E9E9E9
| 370698 ||  || — || May 12, 2004 || Catalina || CSS || — || align=right | 1.6 km || 
|-id=699 bgcolor=#E9E9E9
| 370699 ||  || — || May 13, 2004 || Anderson Mesa || LONEOS || — || align=right | 1.9 km || 
|-id=700 bgcolor=#E9E9E9
| 370700 ||  || — || May 21, 2004 || Campo Imperatore || CINEOS || EUN || align=right | 1.6 km || 
|}

370701–370800 

|-bgcolor=#E9E9E9
| 370701 ||  || — || June 17, 2004 || Kitt Peak || Spacewatch || — || align=right | 2.0 km || 
|-id=702 bgcolor=#FFC2E0
| 370702 ||  || — || July 15, 2004 || Socorro || LINEAR || AMO +1km || align=right | 1.1 km || 
|-id=703 bgcolor=#E9E9E9
| 370703 ||  || — || August 8, 2004 || Anderson Mesa || LONEOS || — || align=right | 2.8 km || 
|-id=704 bgcolor=#E9E9E9
| 370704 ||  || — || August 7, 2004 || Palomar || NEAT || — || align=right | 2.0 km || 
|-id=705 bgcolor=#E9E9E9
| 370705 ||  || — || August 8, 2004 || Socorro || LINEAR || — || align=right | 2.5 km || 
|-id=706 bgcolor=#E9E9E9
| 370706 ||  || — || August 7, 2004 || Campo Imperatore || CINEOS || — || align=right | 1.8 km || 
|-id=707 bgcolor=#E9E9E9
| 370707 ||  || — || August 8, 2004 || Socorro || LINEAR || — || align=right | 2.6 km || 
|-id=708 bgcolor=#E9E9E9
| 370708 ||  || — || August 8, 2004 || Campo Imperatore || CINEOS || GEF || align=right | 1.5 km || 
|-id=709 bgcolor=#E9E9E9
| 370709 ||  || — || August 12, 2004 || Palomar || NEAT || — || align=right | 3.1 km || 
|-id=710 bgcolor=#E9E9E9
| 370710 ||  || — || August 8, 2004 || Socorro || LINEAR || — || align=right | 2.8 km || 
|-id=711 bgcolor=#E9E9E9
| 370711 ||  || — || August 11, 2004 || Socorro || LINEAR || — || align=right | 3.1 km || 
|-id=712 bgcolor=#E9E9E9
| 370712 ||  || — || August 8, 2004 || Socorro || LINEAR || JUN || align=right | 1.4 km || 
|-id=713 bgcolor=#E9E9E9
| 370713 ||  || — || August 21, 2004 || Siding Spring || SSS || — || align=right | 2.7 km || 
|-id=714 bgcolor=#E9E9E9
| 370714 ||  || — || August 25, 2004 || Kitt Peak || Spacewatch || — || align=right | 2.9 km || 
|-id=715 bgcolor=#E9E9E9
| 370715 ||  || — || September 4, 2004 || Palomar || NEAT || — || align=right | 2.6 km || 
|-id=716 bgcolor=#E9E9E9
| 370716 ||  || — || September 4, 2004 || Palomar || NEAT || — || align=right | 3.3 km || 
|-id=717 bgcolor=#E9E9E9
| 370717 ||  || — || September 6, 2004 || Siding Spring || SSS || — || align=right | 2.3 km || 
|-id=718 bgcolor=#E9E9E9
| 370718 ||  || — || September 7, 2004 || Kitt Peak || Spacewatch || JUN || align=right | 1.2 km || 
|-id=719 bgcolor=#E9E9E9
| 370719 ||  || — || September 4, 2004 || Palomar || NEAT || — || align=right | 2.2 km || 
|-id=720 bgcolor=#E9E9E9
| 370720 ||  || — || September 7, 2004 || Kitt Peak || Spacewatch || — || align=right | 2.8 km || 
|-id=721 bgcolor=#E9E9E9
| 370721 ||  || — || September 8, 2004 || Socorro || LINEAR || — || align=right | 1.9 km || 
|-id=722 bgcolor=#E9E9E9
| 370722 ||  || — || September 8, 2004 || Socorro || LINEAR || — || align=right | 3.5 km || 
|-id=723 bgcolor=#FA8072
| 370723 ||  || — || September 8, 2004 || Socorro || LINEAR || — || align=right data-sort-value="0.68" | 680 m || 
|-id=724 bgcolor=#E9E9E9
| 370724 ||  || — || September 8, 2004 || Socorro || LINEAR || — || align=right | 2.4 km || 
|-id=725 bgcolor=#E9E9E9
| 370725 ||  || — || September 8, 2004 || Socorro || LINEAR || — || align=right | 2.5 km || 
|-id=726 bgcolor=#E9E9E9
| 370726 ||  || — || September 8, 2004 || Socorro || LINEAR || ADE || align=right | 2.7 km || 
|-id=727 bgcolor=#E9E9E9
| 370727 ||  || — || September 8, 2004 || Socorro || LINEAR || — || align=right | 2.7 km || 
|-id=728 bgcolor=#E9E9E9
| 370728 ||  || — || September 8, 2004 || Socorro || LINEAR || WIT || align=right | 1.2 km || 
|-id=729 bgcolor=#E9E9E9
| 370729 ||  || — || September 8, 2004 || Socorro || LINEAR || — || align=right | 3.2 km || 
|-id=730 bgcolor=#E9E9E9
| 370730 ||  || — || September 8, 2004 || Socorro || LINEAR || — || align=right | 1.5 km || 
|-id=731 bgcolor=#E9E9E9
| 370731 ||  || — || September 9, 2004 || Socorro || LINEAR || — || align=right | 1.6 km || 
|-id=732 bgcolor=#E9E9E9
| 370732 ||  || — || July 14, 2004 || Socorro || LINEAR || PAL || align=right | 1.4 km || 
|-id=733 bgcolor=#E9E9E9
| 370733 ||  || — || September 7, 2004 || Palomar || NEAT || INO || align=right | 1.1 km || 
|-id=734 bgcolor=#E9E9E9
| 370734 ||  || — || September 6, 2004 || Socorro || LINEAR || — || align=right | 3.5 km || 
|-id=735 bgcolor=#E9E9E9
| 370735 ||  || — || September 6, 2004 || Socorro || LINEAR || — || align=right | 2.2 km || 
|-id=736 bgcolor=#E9E9E9
| 370736 ||  || — || September 7, 2004 || Kitt Peak || Spacewatch || — || align=right | 2.3 km || 
|-id=737 bgcolor=#E9E9E9
| 370737 ||  || — || September 7, 2004 || Kitt Peak || Spacewatch || — || align=right | 2.5 km || 
|-id=738 bgcolor=#E9E9E9
| 370738 ||  || — || September 7, 2004 || Kitt Peak || Spacewatch || AGN || align=right data-sort-value="0.95" | 950 m || 
|-id=739 bgcolor=#E9E9E9
| 370739 ||  || — || September 8, 2004 || Socorro || LINEAR || — || align=right | 1.8 km || 
|-id=740 bgcolor=#E9E9E9
| 370740 ||  || — || September 9, 2004 || Socorro || LINEAR || GEF || align=right | 1.4 km || 
|-id=741 bgcolor=#E9E9E9
| 370741 ||  || — || September 10, 2004 || Socorro || LINEAR || AER || align=right | 1.6 km || 
|-id=742 bgcolor=#E9E9E9
| 370742 ||  || — || September 10, 2004 || Socorro || LINEAR || — || align=right | 1.6 km || 
|-id=743 bgcolor=#E9E9E9
| 370743 ||  || — || September 10, 2004 || Socorro || LINEAR || — || align=right | 2.0 km || 
|-id=744 bgcolor=#E9E9E9
| 370744 ||  || — || September 10, 2004 || Socorro || LINEAR || — || align=right | 1.5 km || 
|-id=745 bgcolor=#E9E9E9
| 370745 ||  || — || September 10, 2004 || Socorro || LINEAR || — || align=right | 3.9 km || 
|-id=746 bgcolor=#E9E9E9
| 370746 ||  || — || September 11, 2004 || Socorro || LINEAR || — || align=right | 2.8 km || 
|-id=747 bgcolor=#E9E9E9
| 370747 ||  || — || September 10, 2004 || Socorro || LINEAR || — || align=right | 3.0 km || 
|-id=748 bgcolor=#E9E9E9
| 370748 ||  || — || September 10, 2004 || Socorro || LINEAR || — || align=right | 1.8 km || 
|-id=749 bgcolor=#E9E9E9
| 370749 ||  || — || September 10, 2004 || Socorro || LINEAR || — || align=right | 2.8 km || 
|-id=750 bgcolor=#E9E9E9
| 370750 ||  || — || August 19, 2004 || Socorro || LINEAR || — || align=right | 3.1 km || 
|-id=751 bgcolor=#E9E9E9
| 370751 ||  || — || September 10, 2004 || Socorro || LINEAR || — || align=right | 3.0 km || 
|-id=752 bgcolor=#E9E9E9
| 370752 ||  || — || August 20, 2004 || Catalina || CSS || — || align=right | 2.7 km || 
|-id=753 bgcolor=#E9E9E9
| 370753 ||  || — || September 11, 2004 || Socorro || LINEAR || TIN || align=right | 1.3 km || 
|-id=754 bgcolor=#E9E9E9
| 370754 ||  || — || September 9, 2004 || Kitt Peak || Spacewatch || NEM || align=right | 2.5 km || 
|-id=755 bgcolor=#E9E9E9
| 370755 ||  || — || September 9, 2004 || Kitt Peak || Spacewatch || — || align=right | 2.4 km || 
|-id=756 bgcolor=#E9E9E9
| 370756 ||  || — || September 12, 2004 || Socorro || LINEAR || GAL || align=right | 1.9 km || 
|-id=757 bgcolor=#E9E9E9
| 370757 ||  || — || September 13, 2004 || Socorro || LINEAR || PAL || align=right | 3.8 km || 
|-id=758 bgcolor=#E9E9E9
| 370758 ||  || — || September 15, 2004 || Socorro || LINEAR || GAL || align=right | 2.2 km || 
|-id=759 bgcolor=#E9E9E9
| 370759 ||  || — || September 6, 2004 || Palomar || NEAT || — || align=right | 2.4 km || 
|-id=760 bgcolor=#E9E9E9
| 370760 ||  || — || September 6, 2004 || Palomar || NEAT || — || align=right | 2.7 km || 
|-id=761 bgcolor=#E9E9E9
| 370761 ||  || — || September 9, 2004 || Socorro || LINEAR || — || align=right | 3.0 km || 
|-id=762 bgcolor=#E9E9E9
| 370762 ||  || — || September 10, 2004 || Kitt Peak || Spacewatch || — || align=right | 2.0 km || 
|-id=763 bgcolor=#E9E9E9
| 370763 ||  || — || September 11, 2004 || Kitt Peak || Spacewatch || — || align=right | 2.3 km || 
|-id=764 bgcolor=#E9E9E9
| 370764 ||  || — || September 13, 2004 || Kitt Peak || Spacewatch || — || align=right | 1.7 km || 
|-id=765 bgcolor=#E9E9E9
| 370765 ||  || — || September 15, 2004 || Kitt Peak || Spacewatch || — || align=right | 2.0 km || 
|-id=766 bgcolor=#E9E9E9
| 370766 ||  || — || September 15, 2004 || Kitt Peak || Spacewatch || — || align=right | 2.3 km || 
|-id=767 bgcolor=#E9E9E9
| 370767 ||  || — || September 11, 2004 || Kitt Peak || Spacewatch || — || align=right | 2.1 km || 
|-id=768 bgcolor=#E9E9E9
| 370768 ||  || — || September 11, 2004 || Kitt Peak || Spacewatch || — || align=right | 1.5 km || 
|-id=769 bgcolor=#E9E9E9
| 370769 ||  || — || September 12, 2004 || Kitt Peak || Spacewatch || — || align=right | 1.8 km || 
|-id=770 bgcolor=#E9E9E9
| 370770 ||  || — || September 12, 2004 || Kitt Peak || Spacewatch || — || align=right | 1.9 km || 
|-id=771 bgcolor=#E9E9E9
| 370771 ||  || — || August 21, 2004 || Catalina || CSS || GEF || align=right | 1.6 km || 
|-id=772 bgcolor=#E9E9E9
| 370772 ||  || — || September 15, 2004 || Kitt Peak || Spacewatch || — || align=right | 2.3 km || 
|-id=773 bgcolor=#E9E9E9
| 370773 ||  || — || September 12, 2004 || Kitt Peak || Spacewatch || — || align=right | 1.7 km || 
|-id=774 bgcolor=#E9E9E9
| 370774 ||  || — || September 15, 2004 || Anderson Mesa || LONEOS || GEF || align=right | 2.3 km || 
|-id=775 bgcolor=#E9E9E9
| 370775 ||  || — || September 15, 2004 || Kitt Peak || Spacewatch || HNA || align=right | 2.1 km || 
|-id=776 bgcolor=#E9E9E9
| 370776 ||  || — || September 15, 2004 || Kitt Peak || Spacewatch || — || align=right | 2.4 km || 
|-id=777 bgcolor=#E9E9E9
| 370777 ||  || — || September 8, 2004 || Socorro || LINEAR || GEF || align=right | 1.6 km || 
|-id=778 bgcolor=#E9E9E9
| 370778 ||  || — || September 10, 2004 || Kitt Peak || Spacewatch || HEN || align=right | 1.1 km || 
|-id=779 bgcolor=#E9E9E9
| 370779 ||  || — || September 17, 2004 || Anderson Mesa || LONEOS || PAL || align=right | 2.1 km || 
|-id=780 bgcolor=#E9E9E9
| 370780 ||  || — || September 18, 2004 || Siding Spring || SSS || — || align=right | 2.1 km || 
|-id=781 bgcolor=#E9E9E9
| 370781 ||  || — || September 17, 2004 || Socorro || LINEAR || — || align=right | 3.2 km || 
|-id=782 bgcolor=#E9E9E9
| 370782 ||  || — || September 18, 2004 || Socorro || LINEAR || — || align=right | 2.8 km || 
|-id=783 bgcolor=#E9E9E9
| 370783 ||  || — || September 18, 2004 || Socorro || LINEAR || — || align=right | 3.5 km || 
|-id=784 bgcolor=#E9E9E9
| 370784 ||  || — || September 22, 2004 || Socorro || LINEAR || DOR || align=right | 2.6 km || 
|-id=785 bgcolor=#FA8072
| 370785 ||  || — || September 24, 2004 || Goodricke-Pigott || R. A. Tucker || — || align=right | 3.0 km || 
|-id=786 bgcolor=#E9E9E9
| 370786 ||  || — || September 22, 2004 || Kitt Peak || Spacewatch || — || align=right | 1.7 km || 
|-id=787 bgcolor=#d6d6d6
| 370787 ||  || — || October 4, 2004 || Kitt Peak || Spacewatch || CHA || align=right | 2.0 km || 
|-id=788 bgcolor=#E9E9E9
| 370788 ||  || — || October 4, 2004 || Kitt Peak || Spacewatch || — || align=right | 2.7 km || 
|-id=789 bgcolor=#E9E9E9
| 370789 ||  || — || October 4, 2004 || Anderson Mesa || LONEOS || DOR || align=right | 3.5 km || 
|-id=790 bgcolor=#E9E9E9
| 370790 ||  || — || October 4, 2004 || Kitt Peak || Spacewatch || — || align=right | 2.1 km || 
|-id=791 bgcolor=#E9E9E9
| 370791 ||  || — || October 5, 2004 || Anderson Mesa || LONEOS || — || align=right | 2.3 km || 
|-id=792 bgcolor=#E9E9E9
| 370792 ||  || — || September 18, 2004 || Socorro || LINEAR || — || align=right | 2.0 km || 
|-id=793 bgcolor=#E9E9E9
| 370793 ||  || — || September 24, 2004 || Kitt Peak || Spacewatch || — || align=right | 2.4 km || 
|-id=794 bgcolor=#E9E9E9
| 370794 ||  || — || October 5, 2004 || Kitt Peak || Spacewatch || — || align=right | 1.8 km || 
|-id=795 bgcolor=#E9E9E9
| 370795 ||  || — || October 5, 2004 || Kitt Peak || Spacewatch || — || align=right | 2.1 km || 
|-id=796 bgcolor=#d6d6d6
| 370796 ||  || — || October 12, 2004 || Moletai || Molėtai Obs. || 615 || align=right | 1.5 km || 
|-id=797 bgcolor=#E9E9E9
| 370797 ||  || — || September 25, 2004 || Anderson Mesa || LONEOS || — || align=right | 3.6 km || 
|-id=798 bgcolor=#E9E9E9
| 370798 ||  || — || October 6, 2004 || Palomar || NEAT || — || align=right | 2.4 km || 
|-id=799 bgcolor=#E9E9E9
| 370799 ||  || — || October 7, 2004 || Socorro || LINEAR || PAD || align=right | 3.1 km || 
|-id=800 bgcolor=#E9E9E9
| 370800 ||  || — || October 6, 2004 || Kitt Peak || Spacewatch || AGN || align=right data-sort-value="0.96" | 960 m || 
|}

370801–370900 

|-bgcolor=#E9E9E9
| 370801 ||  || — || October 6, 2004 || Kitt Peak || Spacewatch || MRX || align=right | 1.2 km || 
|-id=802 bgcolor=#E9E9E9
| 370802 ||  || — || October 6, 2004 || Kitt Peak || Spacewatch || — || align=right | 2.3 km || 
|-id=803 bgcolor=#E9E9E9
| 370803 ||  || — || October 8, 2004 || Socorro || LINEAR || — || align=right | 2.3 km || 
|-id=804 bgcolor=#E9E9E9
| 370804 ||  || — || October 9, 2004 || Socorro || LINEAR || DOR || align=right | 2.9 km || 
|-id=805 bgcolor=#E9E9E9
| 370805 ||  || — || October 7, 2004 || Kitt Peak || Spacewatch || AGN || align=right | 1.5 km || 
|-id=806 bgcolor=#E9E9E9
| 370806 ||  || — || October 5, 2004 || Kitt Peak || Spacewatch || — || align=right | 1.9 km || 
|-id=807 bgcolor=#E9E9E9
| 370807 ||  || — || October 4, 2004 || Kitt Peak || Spacewatch || — || align=right | 2.7 km || 
|-id=808 bgcolor=#d6d6d6
| 370808 ||  || — || October 10, 2004 || Socorro || LINEAR || TRP || align=right | 3.4 km || 
|-id=809 bgcolor=#E9E9E9
| 370809 ||  || — || October 10, 2004 || Palomar || NEAT || — || align=right | 3.4 km || 
|-id=810 bgcolor=#E9E9E9
| 370810 ||  || — || October 7, 2004 || Kitt Peak || Spacewatch || — || align=right | 2.8 km || 
|-id=811 bgcolor=#E9E9E9
| 370811 ||  || — || October 9, 2004 || Kitt Peak || Spacewatch || NEM || align=right | 2.6 km || 
|-id=812 bgcolor=#E9E9E9
| 370812 ||  || — || October 11, 2004 || Palomar || NEAT || — || align=right | 2.6 km || 
|-id=813 bgcolor=#E9E9E9
| 370813 ||  || — || October 9, 2004 || Kitt Peak || Spacewatch || NEM || align=right | 2.4 km || 
|-id=814 bgcolor=#E9E9E9
| 370814 ||  || — || October 10, 2004 || Kitt Peak || Spacewatch || AGN || align=right | 1.2 km || 
|-id=815 bgcolor=#d6d6d6
| 370815 ||  || — || October 10, 2004 || Kitt Peak || Spacewatch || BRA || align=right | 1.4 km || 
|-id=816 bgcolor=#E9E9E9
| 370816 ||  || — || October 12, 2004 || Anderson Mesa || LONEOS || — || align=right | 3.2 km || 
|-id=817 bgcolor=#E9E9E9
| 370817 ||  || — || September 23, 2004 || Kitt Peak || Spacewatch || — || align=right | 1.9 km || 
|-id=818 bgcolor=#E9E9E9
| 370818 ||  || — || October 11, 2004 || Kitt Peak || Spacewatch || — || align=right | 2.3 km || 
|-id=819 bgcolor=#E9E9E9
| 370819 ||  || — || October 15, 2004 || Anderson Mesa || LONEOS || DOR || align=right | 2.8 km || 
|-id=820 bgcolor=#E9E9E9
| 370820 ||  || — || October 8, 2004 || Kitt Peak || Spacewatch || — || align=right | 2.9 km || 
|-id=821 bgcolor=#E9E9E9
| 370821 ||  || — || October 8, 2004 || Kitt Peak || Spacewatch || — || align=right | 2.9 km || 
|-id=822 bgcolor=#d6d6d6
| 370822 ||  || — || October 13, 2004 || Kitt Peak || Spacewatch || — || align=right | 2.2 km || 
|-id=823 bgcolor=#E9E9E9
| 370823 ||  || — || October 18, 2004 || Socorro || LINEAR || CLO || align=right | 3.6 km || 
|-id=824 bgcolor=#E9E9E9
| 370824 ||  || — || October 21, 2004 || Socorro || LINEAR || — || align=right | 2.8 km || 
|-id=825 bgcolor=#E9E9E9
| 370825 ||  || — || November 4, 2004 || Kitt Peak || Spacewatch || — || align=right | 3.1 km || 
|-id=826 bgcolor=#E9E9E9
| 370826 ||  || — || November 4, 2004 || Catalina || CSS || — || align=right | 2.5 km || 
|-id=827 bgcolor=#E9E9E9
| 370827 ||  || — || November 5, 2004 || Palomar || NEAT || — || align=right | 3.3 km || 
|-id=828 bgcolor=#E9E9E9
| 370828 ||  || — || November 3, 2004 || Kitt Peak || Spacewatch || — || align=right | 2.5 km || 
|-id=829 bgcolor=#FA8072
| 370829 ||  || — || November 10, 2004 || Socorro || LINEAR || — || align=right data-sort-value="0.58" | 580 m || 
|-id=830 bgcolor=#E9E9E9
| 370830 ||  || — || November 3, 2004 || Anderson Mesa || LONEOS || — || align=right | 2.6 km || 
|-id=831 bgcolor=#E9E9E9
| 370831 ||  || — || November 3, 2004 || Palomar || NEAT || — || align=right | 2.8 km || 
|-id=832 bgcolor=#E9E9E9
| 370832 ||  || — || November 9, 2004 || Catalina || CSS || — || align=right | 3.3 km || 
|-id=833 bgcolor=#d6d6d6
| 370833 ||  || — || December 8, 2004 || Socorro || LINEAR || — || align=right | 2.4 km || 
|-id=834 bgcolor=#d6d6d6
| 370834 ||  || — || December 12, 2004 || Kitt Peak || Spacewatch || — || align=right | 3.5 km || 
|-id=835 bgcolor=#E9E9E9
| 370835 ||  || — || December 12, 2004 || Socorro || LINEAR || GEF || align=right | 1.7 km || 
|-id=836 bgcolor=#d6d6d6
| 370836 ||  || — || December 11, 2004 || Kitt Peak || Spacewatch || NAE || align=right | 4.9 km || 
|-id=837 bgcolor=#E9E9E9
| 370837 ||  || — || December 11, 2004 || Socorro || LINEAR || — || align=right | 2.7 km || 
|-id=838 bgcolor=#fefefe
| 370838 ||  || — || December 15, 2004 || Socorro || LINEAR || — || align=right data-sort-value="0.78" | 780 m || 
|-id=839 bgcolor=#fefefe
| 370839 ||  || — || December 18, 2004 || Mount Lemmon || Mount Lemmon Survey || — || align=right data-sort-value="0.96" | 960 m || 
|-id=840 bgcolor=#d6d6d6
| 370840 ||  || — || December 18, 2004 || Mount Lemmon || Mount Lemmon Survey || — || align=right | 3.4 km || 
|-id=841 bgcolor=#d6d6d6
| 370841 ||  || — || January 15, 2005 || Kitt Peak || Spacewatch || LIX || align=right | 4.0 km || 
|-id=842 bgcolor=#d6d6d6
| 370842 ||  || — || January 16, 2005 || Mauna Kea || C. Veillet || KOR || align=right | 1.5 km || 
|-id=843 bgcolor=#d6d6d6
| 370843 ||  || — || December 19, 2004 || Mount Lemmon || Mount Lemmon Survey || — || align=right | 3.7 km || 
|-id=844 bgcolor=#d6d6d6
| 370844 ||  || — || February 1, 2005 || Kitt Peak || Spacewatch || — || align=right | 3.2 km || 
|-id=845 bgcolor=#fefefe
| 370845 ||  || — || February 1, 2005 || Kitt Peak || Spacewatch || — || align=right data-sort-value="0.91" | 910 m || 
|-id=846 bgcolor=#d6d6d6
| 370846 ||  || — || February 2, 2005 || Kitt Peak || Spacewatch || KOR || align=right | 1.8 km || 
|-id=847 bgcolor=#d6d6d6
| 370847 ||  || — || February 2, 2005 || Catalina || CSS || ALA || align=right | 4.9 km || 
|-id=848 bgcolor=#d6d6d6
| 370848 ||  || — || January 9, 2005 || Catalina || CSS || — || align=right | 3.3 km || 
|-id=849 bgcolor=#d6d6d6
| 370849 ||  || — || February 9, 2005 || La Silla || A. Boattini, H. Scholl || — || align=right | 2.7 km || 
|-id=850 bgcolor=#fefefe
| 370850 ||  || — || December 20, 2004 || Mount Lemmon || Mount Lemmon Survey || — || align=right data-sort-value="0.90" | 900 m || 
|-id=851 bgcolor=#d6d6d6
| 370851 ||  || — || February 2, 2005 || Kitt Peak || Spacewatch || — || align=right | 3.9 km || 
|-id=852 bgcolor=#d6d6d6
| 370852 ||  || — || November 20, 2003 || Kitt Peak || Spacewatch || — || align=right | 2.6 km || 
|-id=853 bgcolor=#d6d6d6
| 370853 ||  || — || February 2, 2005 || Catalina || CSS || TIR || align=right | 3.4 km || 
|-id=854 bgcolor=#d6d6d6
| 370854 ||  || — || February 9, 2005 || Mount Lemmon || Mount Lemmon Survey || — || align=right | 3.0 km || 
|-id=855 bgcolor=#d6d6d6
| 370855 ||  || — || February 1, 2005 || Kitt Peak || Spacewatch || HYG || align=right | 2.6 km || 
|-id=856 bgcolor=#fefefe
| 370856 ||  || — || February 2, 2005 || Kitt Peak || Spacewatch || — || align=right data-sort-value="0.80" | 800 m || 
|-id=857 bgcolor=#fefefe
| 370857 ||  || — || March 1, 2005 || Gnosca || S. Sposetti || NYS || align=right data-sort-value="0.72" | 720 m || 
|-id=858 bgcolor=#d6d6d6
| 370858 ||  || — || March 1, 2005 || Kitt Peak || Spacewatch || — || align=right | 3.1 km || 
|-id=859 bgcolor=#d6d6d6
| 370859 ||  || — || March 1, 2005 || Kitt Peak || Spacewatch || — || align=right | 3.1 km || 
|-id=860 bgcolor=#fefefe
| 370860 ||  || — || March 2, 2005 || Catalina || CSS || — || align=right | 1.1 km || 
|-id=861 bgcolor=#fefefe
| 370861 ||  || — || March 3, 2005 || Kitt Peak || Spacewatch || — || align=right data-sort-value="0.95" | 950 m || 
|-id=862 bgcolor=#fefefe
| 370862 ||  || — || March 3, 2005 || Catalina || CSS || FLO || align=right data-sort-value="0.78" | 780 m || 
|-id=863 bgcolor=#fefefe
| 370863 ||  || — || March 3, 2005 || Catalina || CSS || — || align=right data-sort-value="0.89" | 890 m || 
|-id=864 bgcolor=#fefefe
| 370864 ||  || — || March 3, 2005 || Catalina || CSS || — || align=right data-sort-value="0.80" | 800 m || 
|-id=865 bgcolor=#fefefe
| 370865 ||  || — || March 3, 2005 || Kitt Peak || Spacewatch || ERI || align=right | 1.8 km || 
|-id=866 bgcolor=#FA8072
| 370866 ||  || — || March 4, 2005 || Socorro || LINEAR || Tj (2.99) || align=right | 2.2 km || 
|-id=867 bgcolor=#fefefe
| 370867 ||  || — || March 4, 2005 || Kitt Peak || Spacewatch || FLO || align=right data-sort-value="0.57" | 570 m || 
|-id=868 bgcolor=#d6d6d6
| 370868 ||  || — || March 4, 2005 || Kitt Peak || Spacewatch || EUP || align=right | 5.4 km || 
|-id=869 bgcolor=#d6d6d6
| 370869 ||  || — || March 4, 2005 || Mount Lemmon || Mount Lemmon Survey || — || align=right | 2.1 km || 
|-id=870 bgcolor=#d6d6d6
| 370870 ||  || — || March 2, 2005 || Catalina || CSS || — || align=right | 4.1 km || 
|-id=871 bgcolor=#d6d6d6
| 370871 ||  || — || March 4, 2005 || Calvin-Rehoboth || Calvin–Rehoboth Obs. || — || align=right | 3.9 km || 
|-id=872 bgcolor=#d6d6d6
| 370872 ||  || — || March 4, 2005 || Kitt Peak || Spacewatch || — || align=right | 3.5 km || 
|-id=873 bgcolor=#d6d6d6
| 370873 ||  || — || December 15, 2004 || Campo Imperatore || CINEOS || — || align=right | 4.2 km || 
|-id=874 bgcolor=#d6d6d6
| 370874 ||  || — || March 8, 2005 || Anderson Mesa || LONEOS || TIR || align=right | 3.7 km || 
|-id=875 bgcolor=#d6d6d6
| 370875 ||  || — || March 8, 2005 || Socorro || LINEAR || HYG || align=right | 3.8 km || 
|-id=876 bgcolor=#d6d6d6
| 370876 ||  || — || March 3, 2005 || Catalina || CSS || — || align=right | 4.9 km || 
|-id=877 bgcolor=#fefefe
| 370877 ||  || — || March 3, 2005 || Catalina || CSS || — || align=right data-sort-value="0.92" | 920 m || 
|-id=878 bgcolor=#d6d6d6
| 370878 ||  || — || March 4, 2005 || Kitt Peak || Spacewatch || EOS || align=right | 1.9 km || 
|-id=879 bgcolor=#d6d6d6
| 370879 ||  || — || March 4, 2005 || Kitt Peak || Spacewatch || THM || align=right | 3.3 km || 
|-id=880 bgcolor=#d6d6d6
| 370880 ||  || — || March 4, 2005 || Mount Lemmon || Mount Lemmon Survey || — || align=right | 4.6 km || 
|-id=881 bgcolor=#fefefe
| 370881 ||  || — || March 10, 2005 || Kitt Peak || Spacewatch || NYS || align=right data-sort-value="0.59" | 590 m || 
|-id=882 bgcolor=#fefefe
| 370882 ||  || — || March 9, 2005 || Mount Lemmon || Mount Lemmon Survey || — || align=right data-sort-value="0.81" | 810 m || 
|-id=883 bgcolor=#fefefe
| 370883 ||  || — || March 9, 2005 || Mount Lemmon || Mount Lemmon Survey || MAS || align=right data-sort-value="0.77" | 770 m || 
|-id=884 bgcolor=#fefefe
| 370884 ||  || — || March 9, 2005 || Mount Lemmon || Mount Lemmon Survey || MAS || align=right data-sort-value="0.76" | 760 m || 
|-id=885 bgcolor=#d6d6d6
| 370885 ||  || — || March 11, 2005 || Kitt Peak || Spacewatch || — || align=right | 4.6 km || 
|-id=886 bgcolor=#fefefe
| 370886 ||  || — || March 1, 2005 || Kitt Peak || Spacewatch || — || align=right data-sort-value="0.71" | 710 m || 
|-id=887 bgcolor=#d6d6d6
| 370887 ||  || — || March 11, 2005 || Mount Lemmon || Mount Lemmon Survey || — || align=right | 3.8 km || 
|-id=888 bgcolor=#d6d6d6
| 370888 ||  || — || March 12, 2005 || Kitt Peak || Spacewatch || — || align=right | 4.4 km || 
|-id=889 bgcolor=#d6d6d6
| 370889 ||  || — || March 4, 2005 || Kitt Peak || Spacewatch || — || align=right | 3.7 km || 
|-id=890 bgcolor=#d6d6d6
| 370890 ||  || — || March 4, 2005 || Mount Lemmon || Mount Lemmon Survey || — || align=right | 2.5 km || 
|-id=891 bgcolor=#fefefe
| 370891 ||  || — || March 12, 2005 || Socorro || LINEAR || FLO || align=right data-sort-value="0.68" | 680 m || 
|-id=892 bgcolor=#d6d6d6
| 370892 ||  || — || March 11, 2005 || Kitt Peak || Spacewatch || — || align=right | 3.6 km || 
|-id=893 bgcolor=#d6d6d6
| 370893 ||  || — || March 11, 2005 || Kitt Peak || Spacewatch || — || align=right | 3.4 km || 
|-id=894 bgcolor=#d6d6d6
| 370894 ||  || — || March 3, 2005 || Kitt Peak || Spacewatch || ELF || align=right | 4.2 km || 
|-id=895 bgcolor=#fefefe
| 370895 ||  || — || February 9, 2005 || Kitt Peak || Spacewatch || FLO || align=right data-sort-value="0.83" | 830 m || 
|-id=896 bgcolor=#d6d6d6
| 370896 ||  || — || March 11, 2005 || Kitt Peak || M. W. Buie || — || align=right | 3.8 km || 
|-id=897 bgcolor=#fefefe
| 370897 ||  || — || March 9, 2005 || Mount Lemmon || Mount Lemmon Survey || FLO || align=right data-sort-value="0.64" | 640 m || 
|-id=898 bgcolor=#d6d6d6
| 370898 ||  || — || March 4, 2005 || Mount Lemmon || Mount Lemmon Survey || — || align=right | 3.0 km || 
|-id=899 bgcolor=#d6d6d6
| 370899 ||  || — || March 8, 2005 || Mount Lemmon || Mount Lemmon Survey || THM || align=right | 2.7 km || 
|-id=900 bgcolor=#fefefe
| 370900 ||  || — || March 11, 2005 || Mount Lemmon || Mount Lemmon Survey || — || align=right data-sort-value="0.62" | 620 m || 
|}

370901–371000 

|-bgcolor=#d6d6d6
| 370901 ||  || — || April 5, 2005 || Mount Lemmon || Mount Lemmon Survey || — || align=right | 3.9 km || 
|-id=902 bgcolor=#d6d6d6
| 370902 ||  || — || April 6, 2005 || Mount Lemmon || Mount Lemmon Survey || — || align=right | 3.9 km || 
|-id=903 bgcolor=#fefefe
| 370903 ||  || — || April 6, 2005 || Kitt Peak || Spacewatch || NYS || align=right data-sort-value="0.70" | 700 m || 
|-id=904 bgcolor=#fefefe
| 370904 ||  || — || April 2, 2005 || Catalina || CSS || PHO || align=right data-sort-value="0.86" | 860 m || 
|-id=905 bgcolor=#fefefe
| 370905 ||  || — || April 4, 2005 || Catalina || CSS || — || align=right | 1.1 km || 
|-id=906 bgcolor=#fefefe
| 370906 ||  || — || April 5, 2005 || Mount Lemmon || Mount Lemmon Survey || NYS || align=right data-sort-value="0.55" | 550 m || 
|-id=907 bgcolor=#fefefe
| 370907 ||  || — || October 16, 2003 || Kitt Peak || Spacewatch || — || align=right data-sort-value="0.68" | 680 m || 
|-id=908 bgcolor=#fefefe
| 370908 ||  || — || April 9, 2005 || Socorro || LINEAR || ERI || align=right | 1.9 km || 
|-id=909 bgcolor=#fefefe
| 370909 ||  || — || April 10, 2005 || Kitt Peak || Spacewatch || — || align=right data-sort-value="0.70" | 700 m || 
|-id=910 bgcolor=#fefefe
| 370910 ||  || — || April 6, 2005 || Mount Lemmon || Mount Lemmon Survey || MAS || align=right data-sort-value="0.74" | 740 m || 
|-id=911 bgcolor=#fefefe
| 370911 ||  || — || May 4, 2005 || Kitt Peak || Spacewatch || — || align=right data-sort-value="0.77" | 770 m || 
|-id=912 bgcolor=#fefefe
| 370912 ||  || — || April 11, 2005 || Mount Lemmon || Mount Lemmon Survey || V || align=right data-sort-value="0.79" | 790 m || 
|-id=913 bgcolor=#fefefe
| 370913 ||  || — || May 8, 2005 || Mount Lemmon || Mount Lemmon Survey || NYS || align=right data-sort-value="0.71" | 710 m || 
|-id=914 bgcolor=#fefefe
| 370914 ||  || — || May 7, 2005 || Mount Lemmon || Mount Lemmon Survey || MAS || align=right data-sort-value="0.69" | 690 m || 
|-id=915 bgcolor=#fefefe
| 370915 ||  || — || May 8, 2005 || Mount Lemmon || Mount Lemmon Survey || — || align=right data-sort-value="0.82" | 820 m || 
|-id=916 bgcolor=#d6d6d6
| 370916 ||  || — || June 1, 2005 || Kitt Peak || Spacewatch || — || align=right | 2.8 km || 
|-id=917 bgcolor=#fefefe
| 370917 ||  || — || June 1, 2005 || Kitt Peak || Spacewatch || V || align=right data-sort-value="0.93" | 930 m || 
|-id=918 bgcolor=#fefefe
| 370918 ||  || — || June 3, 2005 || Kitt Peak || Spacewatch || V || align=right data-sort-value="0.67" | 670 m || 
|-id=919 bgcolor=#fefefe
| 370919 ||  || — || May 3, 2005 || Kitt Peak || Spacewatch || — || align=right data-sort-value="0.87" | 870 m || 
|-id=920 bgcolor=#fefefe
| 370920 ||  || — || May 20, 2005 || Mount Lemmon || Mount Lemmon Survey || NYS || align=right data-sort-value="0.86" | 860 m || 
|-id=921 bgcolor=#fefefe
| 370921 ||  || — || July 4, 2005 || Mount Lemmon || Mount Lemmon Survey || — || align=right data-sort-value="0.87" | 870 m || 
|-id=922 bgcolor=#fefefe
| 370922 ||  || — || July 5, 2005 || Palomar || NEAT || — || align=right data-sort-value="0.97" | 970 m || 
|-id=923 bgcolor=#d6d6d6
| 370923 ||  || — || July 3, 2005 || Catalina || CSS || Tj (2.94) || align=right | 5.9 km || 
|-id=924 bgcolor=#fefefe
| 370924 ||  || — || July 6, 2005 || Kitt Peak || Spacewatch || — || align=right data-sort-value="0.84" | 840 m || 
|-id=925 bgcolor=#fefefe
| 370925 ||  || — || July 11, 2005 || Mount Lemmon || Mount Lemmon Survey || NYS || align=right data-sort-value="0.68" | 680 m || 
|-id=926 bgcolor=#E9E9E9
| 370926 ||  || — || July 4, 2005 || Mount Lemmon || Mount Lemmon Survey || — || align=right data-sort-value="0.83" | 830 m || 
|-id=927 bgcolor=#fefefe
| 370927 ||  || — || July 4, 2005 || Palomar || NEAT || — || align=right data-sort-value="0.89" | 890 m || 
|-id=928 bgcolor=#E9E9E9
| 370928 ||  || — || July 28, 2005 || Palomar || NEAT || — || align=right data-sort-value="0.86" | 860 m || 
|-id=929 bgcolor=#d6d6d6
| 370929 ||  || — || August 1, 2005 || Siding Spring || SSS || HIL3:2 || align=right | 6.4 km || 
|-id=930 bgcolor=#fefefe
| 370930 ||  || — || August 25, 2005 || Palomar || NEAT || H || align=right data-sort-value="0.72" | 720 m || 
|-id=931 bgcolor=#d6d6d6
| 370931 ||  || — || August 25, 2005 || Palomar || NEAT || 3:2 || align=right | 4.0 km || 
|-id=932 bgcolor=#E9E9E9
| 370932 ||  || — || August 28, 2005 || Kitt Peak || Spacewatch || — || align=right | 1.0 km || 
|-id=933 bgcolor=#E9E9E9
| 370933 ||  || — || August 28, 2005 || Kitt Peak || Spacewatch || — || align=right | 1.00 km || 
|-id=934 bgcolor=#E9E9E9
| 370934 ||  || — || August 28, 2005 || Kitt Peak || Spacewatch || — || align=right | 1.1 km || 
|-id=935 bgcolor=#E9E9E9
| 370935 ||  || — || August 27, 2005 || Palomar || NEAT || — || align=right | 1.4 km || 
|-id=936 bgcolor=#fefefe
| 370936 ||  || — || August 31, 2005 || Campo Imperatore || CINEOS || H || align=right data-sort-value="0.65" | 650 m || 
|-id=937 bgcolor=#d6d6d6
| 370937 ||  || — || August 28, 2005 || Kitt Peak || Spacewatch || SHU3:2 || align=right | 5.6 km || 
|-id=938 bgcolor=#E9E9E9
| 370938 ||  || — || September 1, 2005 || Palomar || NEAT || — || align=right data-sort-value="0.90" | 900 m || 
|-id=939 bgcolor=#fefefe
| 370939 ||  || — || September 5, 2005 || Siding Spring || SSS || — || align=right | 1.1 km || 
|-id=940 bgcolor=#E9E9E9
| 370940 ||  || — || August 28, 2005 || Kitt Peak || Spacewatch || RAF || align=right | 1.2 km || 
|-id=941 bgcolor=#d6d6d6
| 370941 ||  || — || September 14, 2005 || Kitt Peak || Spacewatch || 3:2 || align=right | 4.3 km || 
|-id=942 bgcolor=#E9E9E9
| 370942 ||  || — || September 14, 2005 || Catalina || CSS || — || align=right data-sort-value="0.70" | 700 m || 
|-id=943 bgcolor=#fefefe
| 370943 ||  || — || September 23, 2005 || Kitt Peak || Spacewatch || H || align=right data-sort-value="0.66" | 660 m || 
|-id=944 bgcolor=#E9E9E9
| 370944 ||  || — || September 26, 2005 || Kitt Peak || Spacewatch || — || align=right | 1.4 km || 
|-id=945 bgcolor=#E9E9E9
| 370945 ||  || — || September 23, 2005 || Kitt Peak || Spacewatch || JUL || align=right data-sort-value="0.97" | 970 m || 
|-id=946 bgcolor=#E9E9E9
| 370946 ||  || — || September 24, 2005 || Kitt Peak || Spacewatch || — || align=right data-sort-value="0.76" | 760 m || 
|-id=947 bgcolor=#E9E9E9
| 370947 ||  || — || September 24, 2005 || Kitt Peak || Spacewatch || — || align=right data-sort-value="0.96" | 960 m || 
|-id=948 bgcolor=#E9E9E9
| 370948 ||  || — || September 24, 2005 || Kitt Peak || Spacewatch || — || align=right | 1.3 km || 
|-id=949 bgcolor=#E9E9E9
| 370949 ||  || — || September 24, 2005 || Kitt Peak || Spacewatch || — || align=right data-sort-value="0.98" | 980 m || 
|-id=950 bgcolor=#E9E9E9
| 370950 ||  || — || September 24, 2005 || Kitt Peak || Spacewatch || — || align=right data-sort-value="0.88" | 880 m || 
|-id=951 bgcolor=#E9E9E9
| 370951 ||  || — || September 24, 2005 || Kitt Peak || Spacewatch || — || align=right data-sort-value="0.49" | 490 m || 
|-id=952 bgcolor=#E9E9E9
| 370952 ||  || — || September 25, 2005 || Kitt Peak || Spacewatch || — || align=right | 1.3 km || 
|-id=953 bgcolor=#E9E9E9
| 370953 ||  || — || September 26, 2005 || Kitt Peak || Spacewatch || — || align=right data-sort-value="0.82" | 820 m || 
|-id=954 bgcolor=#E9E9E9
| 370954 ||  || — || September 26, 2005 || Kitt Peak || Spacewatch || — || align=right | 1.2 km || 
|-id=955 bgcolor=#E9E9E9
| 370955 ||  || — || September 24, 2005 || Kitt Peak || Spacewatch || — || align=right data-sort-value="0.82" | 820 m || 
|-id=956 bgcolor=#E9E9E9
| 370956 ||  || — || September 24, 2005 || Kitt Peak || Spacewatch || — || align=right data-sort-value="0.68" | 680 m || 
|-id=957 bgcolor=#E9E9E9
| 370957 ||  || — || September 24, 2005 || Kitt Peak || Spacewatch || — || align=right data-sort-value="0.82" | 820 m || 
|-id=958 bgcolor=#E9E9E9
| 370958 ||  || — || September 24, 2005 || Kitt Peak || Spacewatch || — || align=right data-sort-value="0.66" | 660 m || 
|-id=959 bgcolor=#E9E9E9
| 370959 ||  || — || September 24, 2005 || Kitt Peak || Spacewatch || — || align=right | 1.5 km || 
|-id=960 bgcolor=#E9E9E9
| 370960 ||  || — || September 24, 2005 || Kitt Peak || Spacewatch || — || align=right data-sort-value="0.75" | 750 m || 
|-id=961 bgcolor=#E9E9E9
| 370961 ||  || — || September 25, 2005 || Kitt Peak || Spacewatch || — || align=right data-sort-value="0.82" | 820 m || 
|-id=962 bgcolor=#E9E9E9
| 370962 ||  || — || September 29, 2005 || Kitt Peak || Spacewatch || — || align=right data-sort-value="0.85" | 850 m || 
|-id=963 bgcolor=#E9E9E9
| 370963 ||  || — || September 29, 2005 || Anderson Mesa || LONEOS || — || align=right data-sort-value="0.86" | 860 m || 
|-id=964 bgcolor=#E9E9E9
| 370964 ||  || — || September 29, 2005 || Mount Lemmon || Mount Lemmon Survey || RAF || align=right data-sort-value="0.80" | 800 m || 
|-id=965 bgcolor=#E9E9E9
| 370965 ||  || — || September 29, 2005 || Kitt Peak || Spacewatch || — || align=right data-sort-value="0.87" | 870 m || 
|-id=966 bgcolor=#E9E9E9
| 370966 ||  || — || September 29, 2005 || Kitt Peak || Spacewatch || — || align=right data-sort-value="0.94" | 940 m || 
|-id=967 bgcolor=#E9E9E9
| 370967 ||  || — || September 25, 2005 || Kitt Peak || Spacewatch || — || align=right data-sort-value="0.90" | 900 m || 
|-id=968 bgcolor=#E9E9E9
| 370968 ||  || — || September 27, 2005 || Kitt Peak || Spacewatch || — || align=right data-sort-value="0.87" | 870 m || 
|-id=969 bgcolor=#E9E9E9
| 370969 ||  || — || September 29, 2005 || Kitt Peak || Spacewatch || — || align=right | 1.4 km || 
|-id=970 bgcolor=#E9E9E9
| 370970 ||  || — || September 29, 2005 || Kitt Peak || Spacewatch || — || align=right | 1.1 km || 
|-id=971 bgcolor=#fefefe
| 370971 ||  || — || September 29, 2005 || Mount Lemmon || Mount Lemmon Survey || H || align=right data-sort-value="0.69" | 690 m || 
|-id=972 bgcolor=#E9E9E9
| 370972 ||  || — || September 29, 2005 || Kitt Peak || Spacewatch || — || align=right | 1.2 km || 
|-id=973 bgcolor=#E9E9E9
| 370973 ||  || — || September 30, 2005 || Palomar || NEAT || — || align=right data-sort-value="0.90" | 900 m || 
|-id=974 bgcolor=#E9E9E9
| 370974 ||  || — || September 30, 2005 || Catalina || CSS || — || align=right | 1.0 km || 
|-id=975 bgcolor=#fefefe
| 370975 ||  || — || September 30, 2005 || Kitt Peak || Spacewatch || H || align=right data-sort-value="0.64" | 640 m || 
|-id=976 bgcolor=#E9E9E9
| 370976 ||  || — || September 30, 2005 || Mount Lemmon || Mount Lemmon Survey || — || align=right data-sort-value="0.86" | 860 m || 
|-id=977 bgcolor=#E9E9E9
| 370977 ||  || — || September 29, 2005 || Kitt Peak || Spacewatch || — || align=right data-sort-value="0.63" | 630 m || 
|-id=978 bgcolor=#E9E9E9
| 370978 ||  || — || September 30, 2005 || Kitt Peak || Spacewatch || — || align=right data-sort-value="0.89" | 890 m || 
|-id=979 bgcolor=#E9E9E9
| 370979 ||  || — || September 30, 2005 || Kitt Peak || Spacewatch || — || align=right | 1.1 km || 
|-id=980 bgcolor=#E9E9E9
| 370980 ||  || — || September 30, 2005 || Mount Lemmon || Mount Lemmon Survey || — || align=right | 1.1 km || 
|-id=981 bgcolor=#E9E9E9
| 370981 ||  || — || September 30, 2005 || Mount Lemmon || Mount Lemmon Survey || — || align=right | 1.5 km || 
|-id=982 bgcolor=#E9E9E9
| 370982 ||  || — || September 25, 2005 || Palomar || NEAT || — || align=right data-sort-value="0.76" | 760 m || 
|-id=983 bgcolor=#E9E9E9
| 370983 ||  || — || September 26, 2005 || Palomar || NEAT || — || align=right data-sort-value="0.62" | 620 m || 
|-id=984 bgcolor=#E9E9E9
| 370984 ||  || — || September 29, 2005 || Catalina || CSS || — || align=right data-sort-value="0.75" | 750 m || 
|-id=985 bgcolor=#E9E9E9
| 370985 ||  || — || September 30, 2005 || Mount Lemmon || Mount Lemmon Survey || — || align=right | 1.5 km || 
|-id=986 bgcolor=#E9E9E9
| 370986 ||  || — || September 26, 2005 || Apache Point || A. C. Becker || — || align=right | 1.5 km || 
|-id=987 bgcolor=#E9E9E9
| 370987 ||  || — || September 23, 2005 || Kitt Peak || Spacewatch || — || align=right data-sort-value="0.76" | 760 m || 
|-id=988 bgcolor=#E9E9E9
| 370988 ||  || — || September 30, 2005 || Mount Lemmon || Mount Lemmon Survey || — || align=right | 1.1 km || 
|-id=989 bgcolor=#E9E9E9
| 370989 ||  || — || September 29, 2005 || Kitt Peak || Spacewatch || — || align=right data-sort-value="0.90" | 900 m || 
|-id=990 bgcolor=#E9E9E9
| 370990 ||  || — || October 1, 2005 || Mount Lemmon || Mount Lemmon Survey || KON || align=right | 2.0 km || 
|-id=991 bgcolor=#E9E9E9
| 370991 ||  || — || October 1, 2005 || Kitt Peak || Spacewatch || — || align=right data-sort-value="0.90" | 900 m || 
|-id=992 bgcolor=#E9E9E9
| 370992 ||  || — || September 23, 2005 || Kitt Peak || Spacewatch || — || align=right | 1.2 km || 
|-id=993 bgcolor=#E9E9E9
| 370993 ||  || — || October 1, 2005 || Kitt Peak || Spacewatch || — || align=right data-sort-value="0.80" | 800 m || 
|-id=994 bgcolor=#E9E9E9
| 370994 ||  || — || October 3, 2005 || Catalina || CSS || — || align=right | 1.2 km || 
|-id=995 bgcolor=#E9E9E9
| 370995 ||  || — || October 9, 2005 || Ottmarsheim || Ottmarsheim Obs. || — || align=right | 1.1 km || 
|-id=996 bgcolor=#E9E9E9
| 370996 ||  || — || October 11, 2005 || Bergisch Gladbach || W. Bickel || — || align=right data-sort-value="0.98" | 980 m || 
|-id=997 bgcolor=#E9E9E9
| 370997 ||  || — || October 1, 2005 || Catalina || CSS || — || align=right data-sort-value="0.75" | 750 m || 
|-id=998 bgcolor=#E9E9E9
| 370998 ||  || — || October 1, 2005 || Kitt Peak || Spacewatch || — || align=right | 1.2 km || 
|-id=999 bgcolor=#E9E9E9
| 370999 ||  || — || October 3, 2005 || Socorro || LINEAR || — || align=right | 1.5 km || 
|-id=000 bgcolor=#E9E9E9
| 371000 ||  || — || October 5, 2005 || Kitt Peak || Spacewatch || — || align=right data-sort-value="0.98" | 980 m || 
|}

References

External links 
 Discovery Circumstances: Numbered Minor Planets (370001)–(375000) (IAU Minor Planet Center)

0370